This is a partial list of unnumbered minor planets for principal provisional designations assigned between 16 March and 15 April 2003. , a total of 468 bodies remain unnumbered for this period. Objects for this year are listed on the following pages: A–E · F–G · H–L · M–R · Si · Sii · Siii · Siv · T · Ui · Uii · Uiii · Uiv · V · Wi · Wii and X–Y. Also see previous and next year.

F 

|- id="2003 FC" bgcolor=#d6d6d6
| 0 || 2003 FC || MBA-O || 16.75 || 2.5 km || multiple || 2003–2020 || 22 May 2020 || 115 || align=left | Disc.: NEAT || 
|- id="2003 FJ" bgcolor=#fefefe
| 1 || 2003 FJ || HUN || 18.6 || data-sort-value="0.57" | 570 m || multiple || 2003–2020 || 20 Nov 2020 || 55 || align=left | Disc.: NEATAlt.: 2016 DP31 || 
|- id="2003 FN" bgcolor=#E9E9E9
| 0 || 2003 FN || MBA-M || 17.40 || 1.4 km || multiple || 2003–2021 || 11 Sep 2021 || 113 || align=left | Disc.: NEATAlt.: 2007 CM39 || 
|- id="2003 FK1" bgcolor=#FFC2E0
| 9 ||  || ATE || 23.0 || data-sort-value="0.089" | 89 m || single || 8 days || 31 Mar 2003 || 27 || align=left | Disc.: LINEAR || 
|- id="2003 FL1" bgcolor=#fefefe
| 0 ||  || MBA-I || 17.32 || 1.0 km || multiple || 2003–2021 || 28 Nov 2021 || 172 || align=left | Disc.: NEAT || 
|- id="2003 FL2" bgcolor=#d6d6d6
| 1 ||  || MBA-O || 16.4 || 2.9 km || multiple || 2003–2019 || 04 Jan 2019 || 40 || align=left | Disc.: Ondřejov Obs. || 
|- id="2003 FP2" bgcolor=#FA8072
| 0 ||  || MCA || 16.5 || 2.8 km || multiple || 2003–2020 || 16 Nov 2020 || 204 || align=left | Disc.: Farpoint Obs. || 
|- id="2003 FR2" bgcolor=#FA8072
| 8 ||  || MCA || 20.52 || data-sort-value="0.23" | 230 m || single || 12 days || 06 Apr 2003 || 31 || align=left | Disc.: NEAT || 
|- id="2003 FU2" bgcolor=#fefefe
| 1 ||  || MBA-I || 18.3 || data-sort-value="0.65" | 650 m || multiple || 2003–2020 || 17 Apr 2020 || 28 || align=left | Disc.: NEAT || 
|- id="2003 FO3" bgcolor=#FA8072
| 0 ||  || MCA || 18.22 || data-sort-value="0.67" | 670 m || multiple || 2003–2020 || 18 May 2020 || 110 || align=left | Disc.: NEAT || 
|- id="2003 FU3" bgcolor=#FFC2E0
| 3 ||  || ATE || 20.9 || data-sort-value="0.23" | 230 m || multiple || 2003–2018 || 20 Apr 2018 || 125 || align=left | Disc.: LONEOS || 
|- id="2003 FV3" bgcolor=#FFC2E0
| 7 ||  || AMO || 20.8 || data-sort-value="0.25" | 250 m || single || 26 days || 21 Apr 2003 || 63 || align=left | Disc.: NEAT || 
|- id="2003 FB4" bgcolor=#fefefe
| 1 ||  || MBA-I || 17.7 || data-sort-value="0.86" | 860 m || multiple || 2003–2020 || 29 Apr 2020 || 165 || align=left | Disc.: NEATAdded on 22 July 2020Alt.: 2010 EQ120 || 
|- id="2003 FB5" bgcolor=#FFC2E0
| 7 ||  || APO || 23.5 || data-sort-value="0.071" | 71 m || single || 7 days || 02 Apr 2003 || 88 || align=left | Disc.: CINEOS || 
|- id="2003 FF5" bgcolor=#FFC2E0
| 0 ||  || APO || 23.3 || data-sort-value="0.078" | 78 m || multiple || 2003–2019 || 26 Mar 2019 || 128 || align=left | Disc.: NEAT || 
|- id="2003 FT6" bgcolor=#d6d6d6
| 0 ||  || MBA-O || 16.4 || 2.9 km || multiple || 2003–2021 || 11 Sep 2021 || 71 || align=left | Disc.: La Silla Obs.Added on 29 January 2022 || 
|- id="2003 FY6" bgcolor=#FFC2E0
| 1 ||  || ATE || 22.4 || data-sort-value="0.12" | 120 m || multiple || 2003–2018 || 16 Apr 2018 || 184 || align=left | Disc.: LONEOS || 
|- id="2003 FB8" bgcolor=#fefefe
| 1 ||  || HUN || 18.1 || data-sort-value="0.71" | 710 m || multiple || 2003–2020 || 20 Nov 2020 || 117 || align=left | Disc.: LINEAR || 
|- id="2003 FJ8" bgcolor=#FFC2E0
| 5 ||  || APO || 26.7 || data-sort-value="0.016" | 16 m || single || 5 days || 04 Apr 2003 || 44 || align=left | Disc.: LINEAR || 
|- id="2003 FA9" bgcolor=#E9E9E9
| 0 ||  || MBA-M || 16.76 || 1.3 km || multiple || 1997–2021 || 07 Nov 2021 || 116 || align=left | Disc.: NEAT || 
|- id="2003 FE13" bgcolor=#d6d6d6
| 0 ||  || MBA-O || 17.48 || 1.8 km || multiple || 1997–2021 || 13 Jul 2021 || 58 || align=left | Disc.: SpacewatchAdded on 22 July 2020 || 
|- id="2003 FT13" bgcolor=#fefefe
| 0 ||  || MBA-I || 18.66 || data-sort-value="0.55" | 550 m || multiple || 2003–2021 || 09 Apr 2021 || 54 || align=left | Disc.: Spacewatch || 
|- id="2003 FJ14" bgcolor=#d6d6d6
| 0 ||  || MBA-O || 15.94 || 3.6 km || multiple || 1998–2021 || 02 Aug 2021 || 201 || align=left | Disc.: SpacewatchAlt.: 2010 GW40, 2015 FV43 || 
|- id="2003 FV15" bgcolor=#fefefe
| 0 ||  || HUN || 17.8 || data-sort-value="0.82" | 820 m || multiple || 2003–2021 || 12 Jan 2021 || 232 || align=left | Disc.: NEAT || 
|- id="2003 FY17" bgcolor=#E9E9E9
| 0 ||  || MBA-M || 17.2 || 2.0 km || multiple || 2003–2021 || 18 Jan 2021 || 106 || align=left | Disc.: Spacewatch || 
|- id="2003 FE21" bgcolor=#E9E9E9
| 0 ||  || MBA-M || 17.9 || 1.1 km || multiple || 2003–2020 || 23 Jan 2020 || 50 || align=left | Disc.: LPL/Spacewatch IIAlt.: 2016 DE15 || 
|- id="2003 FR22" bgcolor=#fefefe
| 1 ||  || MBA-I || 17.8 || data-sort-value="0.82" | 820 m || multiple || 2003–2020 || 16 May 2020 || 131 || align=left | Disc.: AMOSAlt.: 2008 UM280, 2010 CF222, 2010 PW82 || 
|- id="2003 FG28" bgcolor=#d6d6d6
| 0 ||  || MBA-O || 15.9 || 3.7 km || multiple || 2003–2020 || 24 Mar 2020 || 54 || align=left | Disc.: SpacewatchAdded on 22 July 2020Alt.: 2010 GN68, 2011 SJ79 || 
|- id="2003 FN29" bgcolor=#d6d6d6
| 2 ||  || MBA-O || 17.3 || 1.9 km || multiple || 2003–2019 || 29 Apr 2019 || 48 || align=left | Disc.: NEAT || 
|- id="2003 FB32" bgcolor=#E9E9E9
| 0 ||  || MBA-M || 17.86 || 1.1 km || multiple || 2003–2021 || 30 Oct 2021 || 88 || align=left | Disc.: LPL/Spacewatch II || 
|- id="2003 FM33" bgcolor=#fefefe
| 1 ||  || MBA-I || 18.8 || data-sort-value="0.52" | 520 m || multiple || 2003–2021 || 15 Apr 2021 || 37 || align=left | Disc.: SpacewatchAdded on 11 May 2021Alt.: 2021 EC6 || 
|- id="2003 FN35" bgcolor=#d6d6d6
| 0 ||  || MBA-O || 16.5 || 2.8 km || multiple || 2003–2020 || 21 Apr 2020 || 89 || align=left | Disc.: Spacewatch || 
|- id="2003 FR35" bgcolor=#fefefe
| 0 ||  || MBA-I || 17.95 || data-sort-value="0.76" | 760 m || multiple || 2003–2021 || 31 Mar 2021 || 89 || align=left | Disc.: SpacewatchAlt.: 2008 UN139 || 
|- id="2003 FD40" bgcolor=#fefefe
| 0 ||  || MBA-I || 17.46 || data-sort-value="0.96" | 960 m || multiple || 2003–2021 || 06 May 2021 || 105 || align=left | Disc.: SpacewatchAdded on 11 May 2021Alt.: 2010 JT66, 2014 GT17 || 
|- id="2003 FH42" bgcolor=#E9E9E9
| 0 ||  || MBA-M || 17.15 || 1.6 km || multiple || 2003–2021 || 24 Oct 2021 || 239 || align=left | Disc.: Table Mountain Obs.Alt.: 2016 EL181 || 
|- id="2003 FJ53" bgcolor=#E9E9E9
| 0 ||  || MBA-M || 16.1 || 3.4 km || multiple || 2003–2021 || 06 Jun 2021 || 295 || align=left | Disc.: NEATAlt.: 2010 VV46 || 
|- id="2003 FK55" bgcolor=#fefefe
| 0 ||  || MBA-I || 17.85 || data-sort-value="0.80" | 800 m || multiple || 2003–2021 || 07 Apr 2021 || 124 || align=left | Disc.: NEATAlt.: 2014 EL49 || 
|- id="2003 FD57" bgcolor=#fefefe
| 0 ||  || MBA-I || 18.07 || data-sort-value="0.72" | 720 m || multiple || 2003–2021 || 03 May 2021 || 101 || align=left | Disc.: NEAT || 
|- id="2003 FP59" bgcolor=#d6d6d6
| 0 ||  || MBA-O || 17.20 || 2.0 km || multiple || 2003–2021 || 08 Aug 2021 || 74 || align=left | Disc.: NEATAlt.: 2015 PT159 || 
|- id="2003 FY71" bgcolor=#E9E9E9
| 0 ||  || MBA-M || 16.59 || 2.7 km || multiple || 2002–2021 || 14 Apr 2021 || 297 || align=left | Disc.: AMOS || 
|- id="2003 FM73" bgcolor=#E9E9E9
| 0 ||  || MBA-M || 16.2 || 3.2 km || multiple || 2003–2021 || 13 Jun 2021 || 254 || align=left | Disc.: NEAT || 
|- id="2003 FP73" bgcolor=#E9E9E9
| 0 ||  || MBA-M || 16.71 || 2.5 km || multiple || 2003–2021 || 18 Apr 2021 || 214 || align=left | Disc.: NEATAlt.: 2012 DC22 || 
|- id="2003 FP76" bgcolor=#fefefe
| 0 ||  || MBA-I || 18.2 || data-sort-value="0.68" | 680 m || multiple || 2000–2021 || 12 Jun 2021 || 124 || align=left | Disc.: NEAT || 
|- id="2003 FS81" bgcolor=#d6d6d6
| 1 ||  || MBA-O || 17.3 || 1.9 km || multiple || 2003–2014 || 19 May 2014 || 50 || align=left | Disc.: SpacewatchAlt.: 2014 DF109 || 
|- id="2003 FM87" bgcolor=#fefefe
| 2 ||  || MBA-I || 18.4 || data-sort-value="0.62" | 620 m || multiple || 2001–2017 || 20 Apr 2017 || 60 || align=left | Disc.: LPL/Spacewatch IIAlt.: 2010 CU40 || 
|- id="2003 FN96" bgcolor=#d6d6d6
| 0 ||  || MBA-O || 17.1 || 2.1 km || multiple || 2003–2020 || 11 Dec 2020 || 129 || align=left | Disc.: LPL/Spacewatch IIAlt.: 2017 CX19 || 
|- id="2003 FK97" bgcolor=#fefefe
| 0 ||  || MBA-I || 17.6 || data-sort-value="0.90" | 900 m || multiple || 2003–2019 || 04 Sep 2019 || 116 || align=left | Disc.: LPL/Spacewatch II || 
|- id="2003 FV97" bgcolor=#E9E9E9
| 0 ||  || MBA-M || 16.51 || 2.8 km || multiple || 1995–2021 || 01 May 2021 || 219 || align=left | Disc.: LONEOSAlt.: 2012 AN || 
|- id="2003 FW102" bgcolor=#fefefe
| 0 ||  || MBA-I || 17.0 || 1.2 km || multiple || 2003–2020 || 17 Dec 2020 || 216 || align=left | Disc.: Saint-Sulpice Obs. || 
|- id="2003 FY102" bgcolor=#fefefe
| 0 ||  || MBA-I || 18.38 || data-sort-value="0.63" | 630 m || multiple || 2003–2021 || 11 May 2021 || 80 || align=left | Disc.: Piszkéstető Stn.Alt.: 2014 KA83 || 
|- id="2003 FO110" bgcolor=#E9E9E9
| 0 ||  || MBA-M || 17.20 || 2.0 km || multiple || 2003–2021 || 08 Apr 2021 || 97 || align=left | Disc.: Spacewatch || 
|- id="2003 FZ116" bgcolor=#fefefe
| 0 ||  || MBA-I || 18.37 || data-sort-value="0.63" | 630 m || multiple || 2003–2021 || 01 Apr 2021 || 90 || align=left | Disc.: Spacewatch || 
|- id="2003 FU120" bgcolor=#E9E9E9
| 0 ||  || MBA-M || 17.15 || 2.1 km || multiple || 2003–2021 || 10 Apr 2021 || 124 || align=left | Disc.: LONEOSAlt.: 2015 XT87 || 
|- id="2003 FD122" bgcolor=#d6d6d6
| – ||  || MBA-O || 17.8 || 1.5 km || single || 2 days || 02 Apr 2003 || 10 || align=left | Disc.: Cerro Tololo || 
|- id="2003 FH122" bgcolor=#E9E9E9
| 3 ||  || MBA-M || 17.8 || 1.2 km || multiple || 2003–2016 || 30 Mar 2016 || 38 || align=left | Disc.: Cerro Tololo || 
|- id="2003 FN122" bgcolor=#C2FFFF
| 0 ||  || JT || 14.83 || 6.0 km || multiple || 2003–2021 || 09 Dec 2021 || 91 || align=left | Disc.: Cerro TololoAdded on 24 December 2021Greek camp (L4) || 
|- id="2003 FQ122" bgcolor=#d6d6d6
| 1 ||  || MBA-O || 17.2 || 2.0 km || multiple || 1997–2020 || 15 Oct 2020 || 74 || align=left | Disc.: Mauna Kea Obs.Alt.: 1997 AZ22, 2015 VF11 || 
|- id="2003 FV122" bgcolor=#d6d6d6
| 0 ||  || MBA-O || 17.53 || 1.7 km || multiple || 2003–2021 || 13 Jul 2021 || 32 || align=left | Disc.: Cerro TololoAdded on 22 July 2020 || 
|- id="2003 FY123" bgcolor=#d6d6d6
| 0 ||  || MBA-O || 17.37 || 1.9 km || multiple || 2003–2021 || 07 Sep 2021 || 62 || align=left | Disc.: Kitt Peak Obs. || 
|- id="2003 FH124" bgcolor=#fefefe
| 1 ||  || MBA-I || 18.8 || data-sort-value="0.52" | 520 m || multiple || 2003–2020 || 23 Oct 2020 || 50 || align=left | Disc.: Kitt Peak Obs.Alt.: 2006 BC240 || 
|- id="2003 FK124" bgcolor=#E9E9E9
| 0 ||  || MBA-M || 17.08 || 1.6 km || multiple || 1999–2021 || 26 Aug 2021 || 118 || align=left | Disc.: Kitt Peak Obs.Added on 11 May 2021Alt.: 2009 SL306 || 
|- id="2003 FN124" bgcolor=#E9E9E9
| 0 ||  || MBA-M || 16.90 || 2.3 km || multiple || 1998–2021 || 14 Apr 2021 || 158 || align=left | Disc.: Kitt Peak Obs.Alt.: 2010 VQ172, 2017 FF78 || 
|- id="2003 FX124" bgcolor=#fefefe
| 0 ||  || MBA-I || 18.8 || data-sort-value="0.52" | 520 m || multiple || 2003–2019 || 28 Oct 2019 || 53 || align=left | Disc.: Kitt Peak Obs.Added on 9 March 2021Alt.: 2015 OO71 || 
|- id="2003 FZ124" bgcolor=#fefefe
| 1 ||  || MBA-I || 19.1 || data-sort-value="0.45" | 450 m || multiple || 2003–2021 || 18 Jan 2021 || 30 || align=left | Disc.: Kitt Peak Obs.Added on 22 July 2020 || 
|- id="2003 FB125" bgcolor=#C2FFFF
| 0 ||  || JT || 14.15 || 8.2 km || multiple || 2003–2021 || 27 Nov 2021 || 114 || align=left | Disc.: Kitt Peak Obs.Greek camp (L4) || 
|- id="2003 FD125" bgcolor=#fefefe
| 2 ||  || MBA-I || 19.3 || data-sort-value="0.41" | 410 m || multiple || 2003–2019 || 19 Dec 2019 || 31 || align=left | Disc.: Kitt Peak Obs.Added on 21 August 2021Alt.: 2005 WX197 || 
|- id="2003 FL125" bgcolor=#E9E9E9
| 1 ||  || MBA-M || 18.75 || data-sort-value="0.53" | 530 m || multiple || 2003–2021 || 10 Sep 2021 || 50 || align=left | Disc.: Kitt Peak Obs. || 
|- id="2003 FP125" bgcolor=#fefefe
| 0 ||  || MBA-I || 19.07 || data-sort-value="0.46" | 460 m || multiple || 2003–2021 || 12 Jun 2021 || 42 || align=left | Disc.: Kitt Peak Obs.Alt.: 2008 XP17, 2018 RC20 || 
|- id="2003 FQ125" bgcolor=#d6d6d6
| 0 ||  || MBA-O || 16.8 || 2.4 km || multiple || 1995–2020 || 25 May 2020 || 102 || align=left | Disc.: Kitt Peak Obs.Alt.: 2012 XD127, 2014 DH128 || 
|- id="2003 FR125" bgcolor=#E9E9E9
| 0 ||  || MBA-M || 17.61 || 1.3 km || multiple || 2000–2021 || 15 Jun 2021 || 90 || align=left | Disc.: Kitt Peak Obs.Alt.: 2014 WB219 || 
|- id="2003 FT125" bgcolor=#d6d6d6
| 0 ||  || MBA-O || 17.09 || 2.1 km || multiple || 2003–2021 || 09 Aug 2021 || 60 || align=left | Disc.: Kitt Peak Obs. || 
|- id="2003 FX125" bgcolor=#d6d6d6
| 0 ||  || MBA-O || 16.53 || 2.8 km || multiple || 2003–2021 || 16 Apr 2021 || 120 || align=left | Disc.: Kitt Peak Obs. || 
|- id="2003 FR126" bgcolor=#fefefe
| 0 ||  || MBA-I || 18.20 || data-sort-value="0.68" | 680 m || multiple || 2003–2021 || 09 Apr 2021 || 81 || align=left | Disc.: Spacewatch || 
|- id="2003 FH127" bgcolor=#C2E0FF
| – ||  || TNO || 6.5 || 167 km || single || 22 days || 21 Apr 2003 || 11 || align=left | Disc.: Kitt Peak Obs.LoUTNOs, cubewano (cold) || 
|- id="2003 FJ127" bgcolor=#C2E0FF
| 4 ||  || TNO || 7.5 || 132 km || multiple || 2002–2004 || 22 Feb 2004 || 18 || align=left | Disc.: Kitt Peak Obs.LoUTNOs, other TNO || 
|- id="2003 FL127" bgcolor=#C2E0FF
| 4 ||  || TNO || 6.30 || 260 km || multiple || 2001–2021 || 20 Mar 2021 || 23 || align=left | Disc.: Kitt Peak Obs.LoUTNOs, plutino || 
|- id="2003 FM127" bgcolor=#C2E0FF
| 3 ||  || TNO || 7.1 || 126 km || multiple || 2003–2016 || 29 May 2016 || 15 || align=left | Disc.: Kitt Peak Obs.LoUTNOs, cubewano (cold) || 
|- id="2003 FD128" bgcolor=#C2E0FF
| 3 ||  || TNO || 7.3 || 178 km || multiple || 2002–2013 || 14 Mar 2013 || 18 || align=left | Disc.: Kitt Peak Obs.LoUTNOs, cubewano (hot) || 
|- id="2003 FN128" bgcolor=#E9E9E9
| 0 ||  || MBA-M || 17.89 || 1.5 km || multiple || 2000–2021 || 15 Apr 2021 || 69 || align=left | Disc.: La Palma Obs. || 
|- id="2003 FH129" bgcolor=#C2E0FF
| 2 ||  || TNO || 8.3 || 122 km || multiple || 2003–2015 || 16 Mar 2015 || 17 || align=left | Disc.: Kitt Peak Obs.LoUTNOs, centaur || 
|- id="2003 FL129" bgcolor=#E9E9E9
| 0 ||  || MBA-M || 17.9 || 1.1 km || multiple || 2001–2020 || 24 Mar 2020 || 45 || align=left | Disc.: La Silla Obs. || 
|- id="2003 FM129" bgcolor=#C2E0FF
| 1 ||  || TNO || 6.4 || 198 km || multiple || 2003–2021 || 16 Jun 2021 || 122 || align=left | Disc.: Cerro TololoLoUTNOs, SDO || 
|- id="2003 FZ129" bgcolor=#C2E0FF
| 1 ||  || TNO || 7.4 || 125 km || multiple || 1999–2016 || 17 May 2016 || 26 || align=left | Disc.: Mauna Kea Obs.LoUTNOs, SDO, BR-mag: 1.32; taxonomy: BR || 
|- id="2003 FA130" bgcolor=#C2E0FF
| 2 ||  || TNO || 7.2 || 121 km || multiple || 2000–2013 || 14 May 2013 || 21 || align=left | Disc.: Mauna Kea Obs.LoUTNOs, cubewano (cold) || 
|- id="2003 FB130" bgcolor=#C2E0FF
| E ||  || TNO || 7.5 || 132 km || single || 3 days || 27 Mar 2003 || 4 || align=left | Disc.: Mauna Kea Obs.LoUTNOs, other TNO || 
|- id="2003 FR132" bgcolor=#E9E9E9
| 0 ||  || MBA-M || 17.29 || 1.9 km || multiple || 2000–2021 || 06 May 2021 || 70 || align=left | Disc.: LONEOSAlt.: 2014 UH253 || 
|- id="2003 FZ132" bgcolor=#d6d6d6
| 2 ||  || MBA-O || 16.4 || 2.9 km || multiple || 2003–2020 || 22 Feb 2020 || 54 || align=left | Disc.: Spacewatch || 
|- id="2003 FB134" bgcolor=#E9E9E9
| 0 ||  || MBA-M || 17.99 || data-sort-value="0.75" | 750 m || multiple || 1997–2021 || 14 Aug 2021 || 102 || align=left | Disc.: SDSSAlt.: 2015 BV370 || 
|- id="2003 FD134" bgcolor=#FA8072
| – ||  || MCA || 15.7 || 4.0 km || single || 6 days || 05 Apr 2003 || 7 || align=left | Disc.: Drebach Obs. || 
|- id="2003 FE134" bgcolor=#E9E9E9
| 0 ||  || MBA-M || 17.44 || 1.4 km || multiple || 2003–2021 || 04 Oct 2021 || 136 || align=left | Disc.: Spacewatch || 
|- id="2003 FF134" bgcolor=#fefefe
| 1 ||  || HUN || 18.5 || data-sort-value="0.59" | 590 m || multiple || 2003–2020 || 25 Dec 2020 || 66 || align=left | Disc.: LONEOS || 
|- id="2003 FK134" bgcolor=#d6d6d6
| 0 ||  || MBA-O || 16.5 || 2.8 km || multiple || 2003–2020 || 22 Apr 2020 || 87 || align=left | Disc.: SDSS || 
|- id="2003 FL134" bgcolor=#d6d6d6
| 0 ||  || MBA-O || 16.0 || 3.5 km || multiple || 2003–2020 || 27 Apr 2020 || 112 || align=left | Disc.: SDSS || 
|- id="2003 FM134" bgcolor=#d6d6d6
| 0 ||  || MBA-O || 15.9 || 3.7 km || multiple || 2003–2020 || 23 Jun 2020 || 141 || align=left | Disc.: Spacewatch || 
|- id="2003 FN134" bgcolor=#d6d6d6
| 0 ||  || MBA-O || 16.5 || 2.8 km || multiple || 2003–2020 || 21 May 2020 || 103 || align=left | Disc.: SDSS || 
|- id="2003 FQ134" bgcolor=#fefefe
| 0 ||  || MBA-I || 17.8 || data-sort-value="0.82" | 820 m || multiple || 2003–2021 || 03 Jan 2021 || 135 || align=left | Disc.: Spacewatch || 
|- id="2003 FR134" bgcolor=#E9E9E9
| 0 ||  || MBA-M || 16.50 || 2.8 km || multiple || 2003–2021 || 06 May 2021 || 162 || align=left | Disc.: NEAT || 
|- id="2003 FS134" bgcolor=#d6d6d6
| 0 ||  || MBA-O || 16.4 || 2.9 km || multiple || 2003–2020 || 16 Apr 2020 || 86 || align=left | Disc.: SDSS || 
|- id="2003 FV134" bgcolor=#fefefe
| 0 ||  || MBA-I || 17.9 || data-sort-value="0.78" | 780 m || multiple || 2003–2021 || 04 Jan 2021 || 81 || align=left | Disc.: Spacewatch || 
|- id="2003 FW134" bgcolor=#d6d6d6
| 0 ||  || MBA-O || 16.82 || 2.4 km || multiple || 2003–2021 || 25 Nov 2021 || 123 || align=left | Disc.: SDSS || 
|- id="2003 FX134" bgcolor=#fefefe
| 0 ||  || MBA-I || 18.4 || data-sort-value="0.62" | 620 m || multiple || 2003–2020 || 17 Oct 2020 || 104 || align=left | Disc.: Spacewatch || 
|- id="2003 FY134" bgcolor=#fefefe
| 0 ||  || MBA-I || 17.9 || data-sort-value="0.78" | 780 m || multiple || 2003–2021 || 18 Jan 2021 || 73 || align=left | Disc.: Spacewatch || 
|- id="2003 FB135" bgcolor=#E9E9E9
| 1 ||  || MBA-M || 18.1 || data-sort-value="0.71" | 710 m || multiple || 2003–2019 || 08 Feb 2019 || 62 || align=left | Disc.: SDSS || 
|- id="2003 FD135" bgcolor=#fefefe
| 1 ||  || MBA-I || 18.0 || data-sort-value="0.75" | 750 m || multiple || 2003–2018 || 13 Sep 2018 || 64 || align=left | Disc.: Spacewatch || 
|- id="2003 FE135" bgcolor=#d6d6d6
| 0 ||  || MBA-O || 17.5 || 1.8 km || multiple || 2003–2019 || 06 May 2019 || 55 || align=left | Disc.: SDSS || 
|- id="2003 FF135" bgcolor=#fefefe
| 0 ||  || MBA-I || 17.3 || 1.0 km || multiple || 2003–2020 || 24 Mar 2020 || 83 || align=left | Disc.: Spacewatch || 
|- id="2003 FG135" bgcolor=#E9E9E9
| 0 ||  || MBA-M || 16.76 || 2.5 km || multiple || 2003–2021 || 18 Apr 2021 || 142 || align=left | Disc.: SDSS || 
|- id="2003 FH135" bgcolor=#d6d6d6
| 0 ||  || MBA-O || 16.97 || 2.2 km || multiple || 2003–2021 || 08 Sep 2021 || 69 || align=left | Disc.: SDSS || 
|- id="2003 FJ135" bgcolor=#E9E9E9
| 0 ||  || MBA-M || 17.3 || 1.9 km || multiple || 2003–2021 || 17 Jan 2021 || 107 || align=left | Disc.: SDSS || 
|- id="2003 FK135" bgcolor=#E9E9E9
| 0 ||  || MBA-M || 17.5 || 1.3 km || multiple || 1994–2020 || 27 Jan 2020 || 86 || align=left | Disc.: Spacewatch || 
|- id="2003 FN135" bgcolor=#E9E9E9
| 0 ||  || MBA-M || 17.2 || 1.5 km || multiple || 2003–2020 || 31 Jan 2020 || 67 || align=left | Disc.: SDSS || 
|- id="2003 FP135" bgcolor=#fefefe
| 0 ||  || MBA-I || 17.6 || data-sort-value="0.90" | 900 m || multiple || 2003–2021 || 11 Jan 2021 || 82 || align=left | Disc.: SDSS || 
|- id="2003 FQ135" bgcolor=#d6d6d6
| 0 ||  || MBA-O || 17.1 || 2.1 km || multiple || 2003–2020 || 27 Apr 2020 || 56 || align=left | Disc.: SDSS || 
|- id="2003 FS135" bgcolor=#fefefe
| 0 ||  || MBA-I || 17.9 || data-sort-value="0.78" | 780 m || multiple || 2003–2019 || 30 Aug 2019 || 160 || align=left | Disc.: NEAT || 
|- id="2003 FT135" bgcolor=#fefefe
| 0 ||  || MBA-I || 17.7 || data-sort-value="0.86" | 860 m || multiple || 2003–2020 || 10 Dec 2020 || 76 || align=left | Disc.: SDSS || 
|- id="2003 FU135" bgcolor=#E9E9E9
| 0 ||  || MBA-M || 17.6 || 1.7 km || multiple || 2003–2017 || 26 May 2017 || 49 || align=left | Disc.: SDSS || 
|- id="2003 FV135" bgcolor=#fefefe
| 0 ||  || MBA-I || 18.73 || data-sort-value="0.53" | 530 m || multiple || 2003–2021 || 30 Nov 2021 || 65 || align=left | Disc.: SDSS || 
|- id="2003 FW135" bgcolor=#fefefe
| 0 ||  || MBA-I || 18.38 || data-sort-value="0.63" | 630 m || multiple || 2003–2021 || 14 May 2021 || 94 || align=left | Disc.: SDSS || 
|- id="2003 FY135" bgcolor=#fefefe
| 0 ||  || MBA-I || 18.4 || data-sort-value="0.62" | 620 m || multiple || 2000–2019 || 26 Oct 2019 || 62 || align=left | Disc.: Kitt Peak Obs. || 
|- id="2003 FZ135" bgcolor=#E9E9E9
| 0 ||  || MBA-M || 17.42 || data-sort-value="0.98" | 980 m || multiple || 2003–2021 || 28 Oct 2021 || 75 || align=left | Disc.: Spacewatch || 
|- id="2003 FA136" bgcolor=#E9E9E9
| 0 ||  || MBA-M || 17.3 || 1.9 km || multiple || 2003–2021 || 04 Jan 2021 || 69 || align=left | Disc.: NEAT || 
|- id="2003 FB136" bgcolor=#fefefe
| 0 ||  || MBA-I || 18.30 || data-sort-value="0.65" | 650 m || multiple || 2003–2021 || 18 May 2021 || 77 || align=left | Disc.: SDSS || 
|- id="2003 FC136" bgcolor=#d6d6d6
| 0 ||  || MBA-O || 16.58 || 2.7 km || multiple || 2003–2021 || 13 Jul 2021 || 112 || align=left | Disc.: Spacewatch || 
|- id="2003 FD136" bgcolor=#d6d6d6
| 0 ||  || MBA-O || 16.9 || 2.3 km || multiple || 2003–2020 || 28 Apr 2020 || 63 || align=left | Disc.: LPL/Spacewatch II || 
|- id="2003 FE136" bgcolor=#d6d6d6
| 0 ||  || MBA-O || 16.4 || 2.9 km || multiple || 2003–2020 || 16 May 2020 || 76 || align=left | Disc.: LPL/Spacewatch II || 
|- id="2003 FF136" bgcolor=#d6d6d6
| 0 ||  || MBA-O || 16.96 || 2.3 km || multiple || 2003–2021 || 10 Sep 2021 || 44 || align=left | Disc.: SDSS || 
|- id="2003 FH136" bgcolor=#d6d6d6
| 0 ||  || MBA-O || 16.32 || 3.0 km || multiple || 2003–2021 || 16 Jun 2021 || 121 || align=left | Disc.: SDSS || 
|- id="2003 FJ136" bgcolor=#fefefe
| 0 ||  || MBA-I || 18.1 || data-sort-value="0.71" | 710 m || multiple || 2003–2021 || 18 Jan 2021 || 77 || align=left | Disc.: SDSS || 
|- id="2003 FL136" bgcolor=#d6d6d6
| 0 ||  || MBA-O || 17.06 || 2.2 km || multiple || 2003–2021 || 03 Oct 2021 || 52 || align=left | Disc.: SDSS || 
|- id="2003 FM136" bgcolor=#fefefe
| 0 ||  || MBA-I || 18.0 || data-sort-value="0.75" | 750 m || multiple || 2003–2021 || 06 Jan 2021 || 117 || align=left | Disc.: SDSSAlt.: 2010 EU115 || 
|- id="2003 FO136" bgcolor=#fefefe
| 0 ||  || MBA-I || 18.5 || data-sort-value="0.59" | 590 m || multiple || 2003–2020 || 20 Oct 2020 || 61 || align=left | Disc.: Spacewatch || 
|- id="2003 FP136" bgcolor=#E9E9E9
| 1 ||  || MBA-M || 18.36 || data-sort-value="0.89" | 890 m || multiple || 2003–2021 || 31 Aug 2021 || 62 || align=left | Disc.: Kitt Peak Obs. || 
|- id="2003 FQ136" bgcolor=#fefefe
| 3 ||  || MBA-I || 18.7 || data-sort-value="0.54" | 540 m || multiple || 2003–2017 || 16 Apr 2017 || 41 || align=left | Disc.: Spacewatch || 
|- id="2003 FR136" bgcolor=#fefefe
| 0 ||  || HUN || 18.47 || data-sort-value="0.60" | 600 m || multiple || 2003–2021 || 17 Apr 2021 || 105 || align=left | Disc.: Spacewatch || 
|- id="2003 FS136" bgcolor=#E9E9E9
| 1 ||  || MBA-M || 18.02 || data-sort-value="0.74" | 740 m || multiple || 2003–2021 || 10 Sep 2021 || 46 || align=left | Disc.: SDSS || 
|- id="2003 FT136" bgcolor=#fefefe
| 0 ||  || MBA-I || 18.2 || data-sort-value="0.68" | 680 m || multiple || 2003–2018 || 21 Jun 2018 || 37 || align=left | Disc.: Spacewatch || 
|- id="2003 FX136" bgcolor=#fefefe
| 1 ||  || MBA-I || 18.5 || data-sort-value="0.59" | 590 m || multiple || 2003–2020 || 28 Jan 2020 || 65 || align=left | Disc.: Spacewatch || 
|- id="2003 FY136" bgcolor=#E9E9E9
| 0 ||  || MBA-M || 18.34 || data-sort-value="0.90" | 900 m || multiple || 2003–2021 || 08 Sep 2021 || 74 || align=left | Disc.: Kitt Peak Obs. || 
|- id="2003 FZ136" bgcolor=#fefefe
| 0 ||  || MBA-I || 18.5 || data-sort-value="0.59" | 590 m || multiple || 2003–2020 || 23 Aug 2020 || 43 || align=left | Disc.: LPL/Spacewatch II || 
|- id="2003 FA137" bgcolor=#fefefe
| 0 ||  || MBA-I || 18.27 || data-sort-value="0.66" | 660 m || multiple || 2003–2021 || 13 May 2021 || 79 || align=left | Disc.: Spacewatch || 
|- id="2003 FB137" bgcolor=#fefefe
| 2 ||  || MBA-I || 17.9 || data-sort-value="0.78" | 780 m || multiple || 2003–2018 || 08 May 2018 || 49 || align=left | Disc.: SDSSAlt.: 2010 GT169 || 
|- id="2003 FC137" bgcolor=#fefefe
| 1 ||  || HUN || 18.5 || data-sort-value="0.59" | 590 m || multiple || 2003–2020 || 24 Dec 2020 || 38 || align=left | Disc.: Spacewatch || 
|- id="2003 FE137" bgcolor=#fefefe
| 0 ||  || MBA-I || 18.1 || data-sort-value="0.71" | 710 m || multiple || 2003–2020 || 24 Jun 2020 || 102 || align=left | Disc.: Spacewatch || 
|- id="2003 FG137" bgcolor=#E9E9E9
| 0 ||  || MBA-M || 17.3 || 1.5 km || multiple || 2003–2021 || 08 Jun 2021 || 70 || align=left | Disc.: SDSS || 
|- id="2003 FH137" bgcolor=#fefefe
| 0 ||  || MBA-I || 18.47 || data-sort-value="0.60" | 600 m || multiple || 2003–2021 || 13 Apr 2021 || 41 || align=left | Disc.: Kitt Peak Obs. || 
|- id="2003 FJ137" bgcolor=#fefefe
| 0 ||  || MBA-I || 18.0 || data-sort-value="0.75" | 750 m || multiple || 2003–2019 || 03 Dec 2019 || 45 || align=left | Disc.: Kitt Peak Obs. || 
|- id="2003 FK137" bgcolor=#E9E9E9
| 0 ||  || MBA-M || 16.90 || 2.3 km || multiple || 2003–2021 || 17 Apr 2021 || 59 || align=left | Disc.: SDSS || 
|- id="2003 FL137" bgcolor=#fefefe
| 0 ||  || MBA-I || 18.43 || data-sort-value="0.61" | 610 m || multiple || 2003–2022 || 27 Jan 2022 || 37 || align=left | Disc.: SDSS || 
|- id="2003 FN137" bgcolor=#E9E9E9
| 2 ||  || MBA-M || 17.9 || 1.5 km || multiple || 2003–2017 || 27 May 2017 || 31 || align=left | Disc.: SDSS || 
|- id="2003 FO137" bgcolor=#d6d6d6
| 0 ||  || MBA-O || 16.98 || 2.2 km || multiple || 2003–2021 || 09 Sep 2021 || 89 || align=left | Disc.: SDSSAlt.: 2010 JB67 || 
|- id="2003 FP137" bgcolor=#E9E9E9
| 0 ||  || MBA-M || 18.02 || 1.4 km || multiple || 2003–2021 || 10 May 2021 || 68 || align=left | Disc.: SDSSAlt.: 2016 BY63 || 
|- id="2003 FQ137" bgcolor=#fefefe
| 0 ||  || MBA-I || 19.3 || data-sort-value="0.41" | 410 m || multiple || 2003–2020 || 20 Oct 2020 || 84 || align=left | Disc.: Kitt Peak Obs. || 
|- id="2003 FR137" bgcolor=#fefefe
| 0 ||  || MBA-I || 18.09 || data-sort-value="0.72" | 720 m || multiple || 2003–2022 || 26 Jan 2022 || 37 || align=left | Disc.: Spacewatch || 
|- id="2003 FS137" bgcolor=#E9E9E9
| 0 ||  || MBA-M || 18.0 || 1.1 km || multiple || 2003–2020 || 12 Apr 2020 || 54 || align=left | Disc.: SDSS || 
|- id="2003 FW137" bgcolor=#fefefe
| 0 ||  || HUN || 18.54 || data-sort-value="0.58" | 580 m || multiple || 2003–2021 || 06 Dec 2021 || 126 || align=left | Disc.: Spacewatch || 
|- id="2003 FX137" bgcolor=#E9E9E9
| 0 ||  || MBA-M || 17.20 || 2.0 km || multiple || 2003–2021 || 08 Apr 2021 || 119 || align=left | Disc.: LPL/Spacewatch IIAlt.: 2010 OG43 || 
|- id="2003 FZ137" bgcolor=#fefefe
| 0 ||  || MBA-I || 18.2 || data-sort-value="0.68" | 680 m || multiple || 2003–2019 || 06 Sep 2019 || 70 || align=left | Disc.: Kitt Peak Obs. || 
|- id="2003 FC138" bgcolor=#fefefe
| 1 ||  || MBA-I || 18.1 || data-sort-value="0.71" | 710 m || multiple || 2003–2019 || 01 Nov 2019 || 80 || align=left | Disc.: Kitt Peak Obs. || 
|- id="2003 FF138" bgcolor=#d6d6d6
| 0 ||  || MBA-O || 16.5 || 2.8 km || multiple || 2003–2021 || 04 Jan 2021 || 64 || align=left | Disc.: Kitt Peak Obs. || 
|- id="2003 FG138" bgcolor=#fefefe
| 0 ||  || MBA-I || 18.17 || data-sort-value="0.69" | 690 m || multiple || 2003–2021 || 10 May 2021 || 107 || align=left | Disc.: Spacewatch || 
|- id="2003 FH138" bgcolor=#d6d6d6
| 0 ||  || MBA-O || 17.2 || 2.0 km || multiple || 1995–2020 || 26 May 2020 || 65 || align=left | Disc.: Kitt Peak Obs. || 
|- id="2003 FK138" bgcolor=#d6d6d6
| 0 ||  || MBA-O || 17.4 || 1.8 km || multiple || 2003–2019 || 06 Apr 2019 || 58 || align=left | Disc.: Kitt Peak Obs. || 
|- id="2003 FL138" bgcolor=#fefefe
| 0 ||  || MBA-I || 18.0 || data-sort-value="0.75" | 750 m || multiple || 2003–2019 || 26 Nov 2019 || 51 || align=left | Disc.: SDSS || 
|- id="2003 FM138" bgcolor=#d6d6d6
| 0 ||  || MBA-O || 16.4 || 2.9 km || multiple || 2003–2020 || 26 May 2020 || 65 || align=left | Disc.: SDSS || 
|- id="2003 FO138" bgcolor=#E9E9E9
| 0 ||  || MBA-M || 17.66 || data-sort-value="0.87" | 870 m || multiple || 2003–2021 || 23 Sep 2021 || 78 || align=left | Disc.: Spacewatch || 
|- id="2003 FR138" bgcolor=#E9E9E9
| 0 ||  || MBA-M || 17.6 || 1.3 km || multiple || 2003–2020 || 25 May 2020 || 69 || align=left | Disc.: SDSS || 
|- id="2003 FS138" bgcolor=#E9E9E9
| 0 ||  || MBA-M || 17.53 || 1.7 km || multiple || 2003–2021 || 15 Apr 2021 || 67 || align=left | Disc.: SDSS || 
|- id="2003 FT138" bgcolor=#fefefe
| 0 ||  || MBA-I || 18.5 || data-sort-value="0.59" | 590 m || multiple || 2003–2019 || 03 Oct 2019 || 48 || align=left | Disc.: Kitt Peak Obs. || 
|- id="2003 FU138" bgcolor=#fefefe
| 0 ||  || MBA-I || 18.5 || data-sort-value="0.59" | 590 m || multiple || 2003–2020 || 07 Dec 2020 || 49 || align=left | Disc.: Spacewatch || 
|- id="2003 FV138" bgcolor=#d6d6d6
| 0 ||  || MBA-O || 16.37 || 3.0 km || multiple || 2003–2021 || 17 Apr 2021 || 66 || align=left | Disc.: SDSS || 
|- id="2003 FW138" bgcolor=#E9E9E9
| 0 ||  || MBA-M || 17.52 || data-sort-value="0.93" | 930 m || multiple || 2003–2021 || 30 Oct 2021 || 121 || align=left | Disc.: NEAT || 
|- id="2003 FX138" bgcolor=#fefefe
| 0 ||  || HUN || 18.74 || data-sort-value="0.53" | 530 m || multiple || 2003–2021 || 12 Dec 2021 || 62 || align=left | Disc.: SDSS || 
|- id="2003 FY138" bgcolor=#d6d6d6
| 0 ||  || MBA-O || 16.4 || 2.9 km || multiple || 2003–2020 || 21 Apr 2020 || 71 || align=left | Disc.: SDSS || 
|- id="2003 FZ138" bgcolor=#d6d6d6
| 0 ||  || MBA-O || 17.09 || 2.1 km || multiple || 2003–2021 || 09 Nov 2021 || 61 || align=left | Disc.: SDSS || 
|- id="2003 FA139" bgcolor=#fefefe
| 0 ||  || MBA-I || 18.2 || data-sort-value="0.68" | 680 m || multiple || 2003–2021 || 12 Jan 2021 || 47 || align=left | Disc.: Kitt Peak Obs. || 
|- id="2003 FB139" bgcolor=#fefefe
| 0 ||  || MBA-I || 18.8 || data-sort-value="0.52" | 520 m || multiple || 2003–2020 || 13 Sep 2020 || 52 || align=left | Disc.: SDSS || 
|- id="2003 FC139" bgcolor=#fefefe
| 0 ||  || MBA-I || 18.00 || data-sort-value="0.75" | 750 m || multiple || 2003–2021 || 01 Oct 2021 || 67 || align=left | Disc.: SDSS || 
|- id="2003 FD139" bgcolor=#d6d6d6
| 0 ||  || MBA-O || 17.2 || 2.0 km || multiple || 2003–2020 || 23 Jun 2020 || 59 || align=left | Disc.: SDSS || 
|- id="2003 FE139" bgcolor=#fefefe
| 0 ||  || MBA-I || 18.0 || data-sort-value="0.75" | 750 m || multiple || 2003–2020 || 04 Dec 2020 || 40 || align=left | Disc.: SDSS || 
|- id="2003 FF139" bgcolor=#d6d6d6
| 1 ||  || MBA-O || 16.7 || 2.5 km || multiple || 2003–2019 || 14 Jan 2019 || 37 || align=left | Disc.: Kitt Peak Obs. || 
|- id="2003 FG139" bgcolor=#E9E9E9
| 0 ||  || MBA-M || 17.5 || 1.3 km || multiple || 2003–2020 || 28 Apr 2020 || 49 || align=left | Disc.: SDSS || 
|- id="2003 FH139" bgcolor=#fefefe
| 1 ||  || MBA-I || 17.9 || data-sort-value="0.78" | 780 m || multiple || 2003–2019 || 27 Oct 2019 || 35 || align=left | Disc.: Spacewatch || 
|- id="2003 FJ139" bgcolor=#E9E9E9
| 1 ||  || MBA-M || 17.4 || 1.8 km || multiple || 2003–2018 || 12 Sep 2018 || 36 || align=left | Disc.: Spacewatch || 
|- id="2003 FK139" bgcolor=#d6d6d6
| 0 ||  || MBA-O || 17.1 || 2.1 km || multiple || 2003–2020 || 10 Dec 2020 || 38 || align=left | Disc.: Spacewatch || 
|- id="2003 FL139" bgcolor=#fefefe
| 0 ||  || MBA-I || 18.0 || data-sort-value="0.75" | 750 m || multiple || 2003–2019 || 23 Sep 2019 || 179 || align=left | Disc.: Kitt Peak Obs. || 
|- id="2003 FM139" bgcolor=#fefefe
| 0 ||  || MBA-I || 17.7 || data-sort-value="0.86" | 860 m || multiple || 2003–2019 || 29 Sep 2019 || 66 || align=left | Disc.: Spacewatch || 
|- id="2003 FP139" bgcolor=#fefefe
| 0 ||  || MBA-I || 18.2 || data-sort-value="0.68" | 680 m || multiple || 2003–2020 || 20 Oct 2020 || 107 || align=left | Disc.: LPL/Spacewatch IIAlt.: 2016 UG156 || 
|- id="2003 FQ139" bgcolor=#fefefe
| 1 ||  || MBA-I || 18.2 || data-sort-value="0.68" | 680 m || multiple || 2003–2020 || 15 Sep 2020 || 83 || align=left | Disc.: SDSS || 
|- id="2003 FS139" bgcolor=#C2FFFF
| 0 ||  || JT || 13.80 || 9.7 km || multiple || 2003–2022 || 21 Jan 2022 || 148 || align=left | Disc.: SpacewatchGreek camp (L4) || 
|- id="2003 FT139" bgcolor=#E9E9E9
| 0 ||  || MBA-M || 17.5 || 1.3 km || multiple || 2003–2021 || 09 Jun 2021 || 70 || align=left | Disc.: LPL/Spacewatch II || 
|- id="2003 FV139" bgcolor=#d6d6d6
| 0 ||  || MBA-O || 17.0 || 2.2 km || multiple || 2003–2020 || 13 May 2020 || 60 || align=left | Disc.: Kitt Peak Obs. || 
|- id="2003 FX139" bgcolor=#C2FFFF
| 0 ||  || JT || 14.31 || 7.7 km || multiple || 2003–2022 || 21 Jan 2022 || 144 || align=left | Disc.: SDSSGreek camp (L4) || 
|- id="2003 FZ139" bgcolor=#fefefe
| 0 ||  || MBA-I || 18.2 || data-sort-value="0.68" | 680 m || multiple || 2003–2021 || 18 Jan 2021 || 51 || align=left | Disc.: Kitt Peak Obs. || 
|- id="2003 FA140" bgcolor=#d6d6d6
| 0 ||  || MBA-O || 17.3 || 1.9 km || multiple || 2003–2020 || 22 Apr 2020 || 66 || align=left | Disc.: Kitt Peak Obs. || 
|- id="2003 FB140" bgcolor=#E9E9E9
| 0 ||  || MBA-M || 17.6 || 1.3 km || multiple || 2003–2021 || 15 Apr 2021 || 59 || align=left | Disc.: SDSSAlt.: 2014 UX35 || 
|- id="2003 FD140" bgcolor=#fefefe
| 0 ||  || MBA-I || 18.5 || data-sort-value="0.59" | 590 m || multiple || 2003–2020 || 14 Sep 2020 || 52 || align=left | Disc.: Spacewatch || 
|- id="2003 FE140" bgcolor=#d6d6d6
| 0 ||  || MBA-O || 17.13 || 2.1 km || multiple || 2003–2021 || 07 Sep 2021 || 50 || align=left | Disc.: SDSS || 
|- id="2003 FF140" bgcolor=#fefefe
| 0 ||  || MBA-I || 18.52 || data-sort-value="0.59" | 590 m || multiple || 2003–2021 || 11 Jun 2021 || 100 || align=left | Disc.: SDSS || 
|- id="2003 FH140" bgcolor=#d6d6d6
| 0 ||  || MBA-O || 16.8 || 2.4 km || multiple || 2003–2020 || 24 Jun 2020 || 70 || align=left | Disc.: SDSS || 
|- id="2003 FJ140" bgcolor=#d6d6d6
| 0 ||  || MBA-O || 17.44 || 1.8 km || multiple || 2003–2021 || 31 Aug 2021 || 48 || align=left | Disc.: Spacewatch || 
|- id="2003 FK140" bgcolor=#d6d6d6
| 0 ||  || MBA-O || 17.34 || 1.9 km || multiple || 2003–2021 || 07 Nov 2021 || 53 || align=left | Disc.: SDSSAlt.: 2010 NS140 || 
|- id="2003 FL140" bgcolor=#d6d6d6
| 0 ||  || MBA-O || 17.1 || 2.1 km || multiple || 2003–2020 || 23 Jun 2020 || 61 || align=left | Disc.: SDSS || 
|- id="2003 FM140" bgcolor=#d6d6d6
| 0 ||  || MBA-O || 16.52 || 2.8 km || multiple || 2003–2021 || 28 Oct 2021 || 138 || align=left | Disc.: SDSSAlt.: 2010 JO92 || 
|- id="2003 FN140" bgcolor=#fefefe
| 0 ||  || MBA-I || 18.77 || data-sort-value="0.52" | 520 m || multiple || 2003–2021 || 09 May 2021 || 66 || align=left | Disc.: SDSS || 
|- id="2003 FO140" bgcolor=#E9E9E9
| 0 ||  || MBA-M || 17.2 || 2.0 km || multiple || 2003–2021 || 08 Jan 2021 || 71 || align=left | Disc.: SDSS || 
|- id="2003 FQ140" bgcolor=#fefefe
| 0 ||  || MBA-I || 18.9 || data-sort-value="0.49" | 490 m || multiple || 2003–2019 || 28 Oct 2019 || 49 || align=left | Disc.: Kitt Peak Obs. || 
|- id="2003 FR140" bgcolor=#E9E9E9
| 1 ||  || MBA-M || 18.3 || 1.2 km || multiple || 2003–2019 || 20 Dec 2019 || 35 || align=left | Disc.: Kitt Peak Obs. || 
|- id="2003 FS140" bgcolor=#d6d6d6
| 0 ||  || MBA-O || 17.3 || 1.9 km || multiple || 2003–2019 || 03 Oct 2019 || 55 || align=left | Disc.: Kitt Peak Obs. || 
|- id="2003 FT140" bgcolor=#C2FFFF
| 0 ||  || JT || 14.04 || 8.7 km || multiple || 2003–2022 || 27 Jan 2022 || 121 || align=left | Disc.: SDSSGreek camp (L4) || 
|- id="2003 FU140" bgcolor=#fefefe
| 0 ||  || MBA-I || 18.6 || data-sort-value="0.57" | 570 m || multiple || 2003–2020 || 26 Jan 2020 || 56 || align=left | Disc.: Cerro Tololo || 
|- id="2003 FV140" bgcolor=#fefefe
| 1 ||  || MBA-I || 19.0 || data-sort-value="0.47" | 470 m || multiple || 2003–2020 || 02 Feb 2020 || 60 || align=left | Disc.: LPL/Spacewatch II || 
|- id="2003 FW140" bgcolor=#d6d6d6
| 0 ||  || MBA-O || 17.08 || 2.1 km || multiple || 2003–2022 || 25 Jan 2022 || 98 || align=left | Disc.: Spacewatch || 
|- id="2003 FX140" bgcolor=#d6d6d6
| 0 ||  || MBA-O || 17.4 || 1.8 km || multiple || 2003–2020 || 17 Dec 2020 || 63 || align=left | Disc.: SDSS || 
|- id="2003 FY140" bgcolor=#E9E9E9
| 0 ||  || MBA-M || 18.2 || data-sort-value="0.96" | 960 m || multiple || 2003–2020 || 27 Jan 2020 || 39 || align=left | Disc.: SDSS || 
|- id="2003 FZ140" bgcolor=#fefefe
| 1 ||  || MBA-I || 18.1 || data-sort-value="0.71" | 710 m || multiple || 2003–2018 || 14 Sep 2018 || 40 || align=left | Disc.: Spacewatch || 
|- id="2003 FA141" bgcolor=#fefefe
| 0 ||  || MBA-I || 18.3 || data-sort-value="0.65" | 650 m || multiple || 2003–2019 || 08 Jan 2019 || 33 || align=left | Disc.: Spacewatch || 
|- id="2003 FB141" bgcolor=#fefefe
| 0 ||  || MBA-I || 18.93 || data-sort-value="0.49" | 490 m || multiple || 2003–2021 || 03 Oct 2021 || 71 || align=left | Disc.: Kitt Peak Obs. || 
|- id="2003 FC141" bgcolor=#d6d6d6
| 0 ||  || MBA-O || 17.71 || 1.6 km || multiple || 2003–2021 || 02 Oct 2021 || 90 || align=left | Disc.: Kitt Peak Obs. || 
|- id="2003 FD141" bgcolor=#E9E9E9
| 3 ||  || MBA-M || 18.6 || data-sort-value="0.57" | 570 m || multiple || 1999–2015 || 10 Jan 2015 || 33 || align=left | Disc.: SpacewatchAdded on 22 July 2020 || 
|- id="2003 FE141" bgcolor=#fefefe
| 1 ||  || MBA-I || 18.6 || data-sort-value="0.57" | 570 m || multiple || 2003–2020 || 22 Mar 2020 || 61 || align=left | Disc.: LPL/Spacewatch IIAdded on 22 July 2020 || 
|- id="2003 FG141" bgcolor=#E9E9E9
| 0 ||  || MBA-M || 17.9 || 1.1 km || multiple || 2003–2020 || 22 Mar 2020 || 52 || align=left | Disc.: NEATAdded on 22 July 2020 || 
|- id="2003 FH141" bgcolor=#d6d6d6
| 0 ||  || MBA-O || 16.98 || 2.2 km || multiple || 2003–2021 || 08 Jun 2021 || 72 || align=left | Disc.: SpacewatchAdded on 22 July 2020 || 
|- id="2003 FK141" bgcolor=#fefefe
| 0 ||  || MBA-I || 18.22 || data-sort-value="0.67" | 670 m || multiple || 2003–2022 || 09 Jan 2022 || 37 || align=left | Disc.: SpacewatchAdded on 22 July 2020 || 
|- id="2003 FL141" bgcolor=#d6d6d6
| 0 ||  || MBA-O || 16.58 || 2.7 km || multiple || 2003–2021 || 09 Jul 2021 || 51 || align=left | Disc.: SpacewatchAdded on 22 July 2020 || 
|- id="2003 FM141" bgcolor=#d6d6d6
| 1 ||  || MBA-O || 17.2 || 2.0 km || multiple || 2003–2020 || 20 May 2020 || 33 || align=left | Disc.: SDSSAdded on 13 September 2020 || 
|- id="2003 FN141" bgcolor=#E9E9E9
| 0 ||  || MBA-M || 17.6 || data-sort-value="0.90" | 900 m || multiple || 2003–2020 || 13 Sep 2020 || 68 || align=left | Disc.: LPL/Spacewatch IIAdded on 19 October 2020 || 
|- id="2003 FO141" bgcolor=#fefefe
| 4 ||  || MBA-I || 18.6 || data-sort-value="0.57" | 570 m || multiple || 2003–2020 || 14 Dec 2020 || 23 || align=left | Disc.: SpacewatchAdded on 19 October 2020 || 
|- id="2003 FP141" bgcolor=#E9E9E9
| 0 ||  || MBA-M || 17.85 || data-sort-value="0.80" | 800 m || multiple || 1999–2021 || 11 Oct 2021 || 53 || align=left | Disc.: SDSSAdded on 19 October 2020Alt.: 2009 WM49 || 
|- id="2003 FR141" bgcolor=#d6d6d6
| 0 ||  || MBA-O || 16.8 || 2.4 km || multiple || 2003–2020 || 21 Oct 2020 || 57 || align=left | Disc.: SDSSAdded on 17 January 2021 || 
|- id="2003 FT141" bgcolor=#fefefe
| 0 ||  || MBA-I || 18.28 || data-sort-value="0.66" | 660 m || multiple || 2003–2021 || 08 May 2021 || 110 || align=left | Disc.: SpacewatchAdded on 17 January 2021 || 
|- id="2003 FV141" bgcolor=#fefefe
| 0 ||  || MBA-I || 18.3 || data-sort-value="0.65" | 650 m || multiple || 2001–2021 || 04 Jan 2021 || 62 || align=left | Disc.: SDSSAdded on 11 May 2021 || 
|- id="2003 FW141" bgcolor=#E9E9E9
| 0 ||  || MBA-M || 17.52 || 1.7 km || multiple || 2003–2021 || 12 Jun 2021 || 50 || align=left | Disc.: SDSSAdded on 11 May 2021 || 
|- id="2003 FX141" bgcolor=#d6d6d6
| 0 ||  || MBA-O || 17.29 || 1.9 km || multiple || 2003–2021 || 10 Aug 2021 || 37 || align=left | Disc.: SpacewatchAdded on 21 August 2021 || 
|- id="2003 FY141" bgcolor=#d6d6d6
| 0 ||  || MBA-O || 17.30 || 1.9 km || multiple || 2003–2022 || 27 Jan 2022 || 40 || align=left | Disc.: SDSSAdded on 21 August 2021 || 
|- id="2003 FZ141" bgcolor=#d6d6d6
| 0 ||  || MBA-O || 17.38 || 1.9 km || multiple || 2003–2021 || 26 Nov 2021 || 57 || align=left | Disc.: SpacewatchAdded on 5 November 2021 || 
|- id="2003 FA142" bgcolor=#E9E9E9
| 1 ||  || MBA-M || 18.0 || 1.1 km || multiple || 2003–2016 || 13 Mar 2016 || 19 || align=left | Disc.: SDSSAdded on 29 January 2022 || 
|}
back to top

G 

|- id="2003 GD" bgcolor=#FFC2E0
| 6 || 2003 GD || APO || 22.1 || data-sort-value="0.14" | 140 m || single || 20 days || 22 Apr 2003 || 82 || align=left | Disc.: LONEOSAMO at MPC || 
|- id="2003 GJ" bgcolor=#FA8072
| 2 || 2003 GJ || MCA || 19.5 || data-sort-value="0.53" | 530 m || multiple || 2003–2016 || 01 Apr 2016 || 82 || align=left | Disc.: LONEOS || 
|- id="2003 GX" bgcolor=#FFC2E0
| 7 || 2003 GX || AMO || 24.1 || data-sort-value="0.054" | 54 m || single || 18 days || 23 Apr 2003 || 50 || align=left | Disc.: LONEOS || 
|- id="2003 GB2" bgcolor=#fefefe
| 1 ||  || MBA-I || 17.9 || data-sort-value="0.78" | 780 m || multiple || 2003–2019 || 02 Dec 2019 || 110 || align=left | Disc.: LINEARAlt.: 2010 CZ183 || 
|- id="2003 GY6" bgcolor=#fefefe
| 0 ||  || MBA-I || 17.9 || data-sort-value="0.78" | 780 m || multiple || 2003–2021 || 18 Jan 2021 || 87 || align=left | Disc.: LONEOS || 
|- id="2003 GZ9" bgcolor=#E9E9E9
| 0 ||  || MBA-M || 17.34 || 1.4 km || multiple || 2003–2021 || 30 Oct 2021 || 158 || align=left | Disc.: AMOSAlt.: 2014 YM91 || 
|- id="2003 GC10" bgcolor=#FA8072
| 0 ||  || MCA || 18.70 || data-sort-value="0.54" | 540 m || multiple || 2003–2021 || 06 Nov 2021 || 41 || align=left | Disc.: AMOS || 
|- id="2003 GQ11" bgcolor=#fefefe
| 0 ||  || MBA-I || 18.15 || data-sort-value="0.70" | 700 m || multiple || 2003–2021 || 14 Apr 2021 || 94 || align=left | Disc.: LPL/Spacewatch II || 
|- id="2003 GA14" bgcolor=#fefefe
| 0 ||  || HUN || 18.86 || data-sort-value="0.50" | 500 m || multiple || 2003–2021 || 17 Apr 2021 || 101 || align=left | Disc.: LPL/Spacewatch IIAlt.: 2016 FP47 || 
|- id="2003 GJ17" bgcolor=#d6d6d6
| 0 ||  || MBA-O || 17.47 || 1.8 km || multiple || 2003–2019 || 01 Aug 2019 || 39 || align=left | Disc.: LONEOS || 
|- id="2003 GS18" bgcolor=#E9E9E9
| 3 ||  || MBA-M || 18.7 || data-sort-value="0.76" | 760 m || multiple || 2003–2020 || 25 May 2020 || 17 || align=left | Disc.: SpacewatchAdded on 9 March 2021 || 
|- id="2003 GX18" bgcolor=#d6d6d6
| 3 ||  || MBA-O || 16.9 || 2.3 km || multiple || 2003–2020 || 26 Apr 2020 || 38 || align=left | Disc.: SpacewatchAdded on 22 July 2020 || 
|- id="2003 GO19" bgcolor=#E9E9E9
| 5 ||  || MBA-M || 17.8 || data-sort-value="0.82" | 820 m || multiple || 2003–2009 || 21 Nov 2009 || 14 || align=left | Disc.: SpacewatchAlt.: 2009 WZ50 || 
|- id="2003 GF21" bgcolor=#FFC2E0
| 8 ||  || APO || 22.2 || data-sort-value="0.13" | 130 m || single || 3 days || 10 Apr 2003 || 39 || align=left | Disc.: LONEOS || 
|- id="2003 GG21" bgcolor=#FFC2E0
| 0 ||  || APO || 21.97 || data-sort-value="0.14" | 140 m || multiple || 2003–2021 || 11 Oct 2021 || 176 || align=left | Disc.: NEATPotentially hazardous object || 
|- id="2003 GH21" bgcolor=#FFC2E0
| 0 ||  || AMO || 21.59 || data-sort-value="0.17" | 170 m || multiple || 2003–2021 || 31 May 2021 || 130 || align=left | Disc.: LINEAR || 
|- id="2003 GJ21" bgcolor=#FFC2E0
| 4 ||  || AMO || 22.9 || data-sort-value="0.093" | 93 m || single || 93 days || 03 Jul 2003 || 69 || align=left | Disc.: Spacewatch || 
|- id="2003 GL21" bgcolor=#C2FFFF
| 0 ||  || JT || 14.30 || 7.7 km || multiple || 2003–2021 || 27 Nov 2021 || 142 || align=left | Disc.: SpacewatchGreek camp (L4) || 
|- id="2003 GM21" bgcolor=#E9E9E9
| 0 ||  || MBA-M || 17.7 || 1.2 km || multiple || 2003–2020 || 29 May 2020 || 220 || align=left | Disc.: NEAT || 
|- id="2003 GQ21" bgcolor=#fefefe
| 0 ||  || HUN || 18.6 || data-sort-value="0.57" | 570 m || multiple || 2003–2020 || 27 Oct 2020 || 67 || align=left | Disc.: Spacewatch || 
|- id="2003 GT21" bgcolor=#fefefe
| 1 ||  || HUN || 18.9 || data-sort-value="0.49" | 490 m || multiple || 2003–2020 || 19 Aug 2020 || 40 || align=left | Disc.: Spacewatch Added on 11 May 2021Alt.: 2020 PR1 || 
|- id="2003 GV21" bgcolor=#fefefe
| 0 ||  || HUN || 19.05 || data-sort-value="0.46" | 460 m || multiple || 2003–2021 || 18 Apr 2021 || 56 || align=left | Disc.: Spacewatch || 
|- id="2003 GY21" bgcolor=#d6d6d6
| 0 ||  || MBA-O || 16.14 || 4.1 km || multiple || 2003–2021 || 08 Sep 2021 || 249 || align=left | Disc.: NEATAlt.: 2010 KR33 || 
|- id="2003 GQ22" bgcolor=#FFC2E0
| 1 ||  || ATE || 21.48 || data-sort-value="0.18" | 180 m || multiple || 2003–2016 || 02 May 2016 || 80 || align=left | Disc.: LINEARPotentially hazardous object || 
|- id="2003 GR22" bgcolor=#FFC2E0
| 3 ||  || APO || 22.0 || data-sort-value="0.14" | 140 m || multiple || 2003–2020 || 19 Nov 2020 || 71 || align=left | Disc.: LINEARPotentially hazardous object || 
|- id="2003 GS22" bgcolor=#FFC2E0
| 0 ||  || AMO || 22.5 || data-sort-value="0.11" | 110 m || multiple || 2003–2021 || 13 Apr 2021 || 113 || align=left | Disc.: SpacewatchAlt.: 2021 AD2 || 
|- id="2003 GO24" bgcolor=#fefefe
| 0 ||  || MBA-I || 18.9 || data-sort-value="0.49" | 490 m || multiple || 2003–2020 || 23 Sep 2020 || 50 || align=left | Disc.: Spacewatch || 
|- id="2003 GT24" bgcolor=#d6d6d6
| 0 ||  || MBA-O || 16.6 || 2.7 km || multiple || 2003–2020 || 26 May 2020 || 48 || align=left | Disc.: SpacewatchAlt.: 2010 LW144 || 
|- id="2003 GW24" bgcolor=#d6d6d6
| 0 ||  || MBA-O || 16.95 || 2.3 km || multiple || 2003–2021 || 25 Nov 2021 || 125 || align=left | Disc.: SpacewatchAlt.: 2008 FL85 || 
|- id="2003 GC26" bgcolor=#fefefe
| 0 ||  || MBA-I || 17.9 || data-sort-value="0.78" | 780 m || multiple || 2003–2019 || 03 Dec 2019 || 76 || align=left | Disc.: SpacewatchAlt.: 2004 TY176, 2015 UC19 || 
|- id="2003 GW29" bgcolor=#fefefe
| 0 ||  || HUN || 18.7 || data-sort-value="0.54" | 540 m || multiple || 2003–2020 || 06 Dec 2020 || 140 || align=left | Disc.: SpacewatchAdded on 19 October 2020Alt.: 2019 FE2 || 
|- id="2003 GY29" bgcolor=#fefefe
| 0 ||  || MBA-I || 17.8 || data-sort-value="0.82" | 820 m || multiple || 2000–2021 || 10 Jan 2021 || 70 || align=left | Disc.: SpacewatchAlt.: 2014 ED135 || 
|- id="2003 GK30" bgcolor=#fefefe
| 0 ||  || MBA-I || 17.8 || data-sort-value="0.82" | 820 m || multiple || 2003–2021 || 11 Jun 2021 || 152 || align=left | Disc.: LPL/Spacewatch IIAlt.: 2010 FM17, 2015 XE67 || 
|- id="2003 GG31" bgcolor=#d6d6d6
| 0 ||  || MBA-O || 17.45 || 1.8 km || multiple || 2003–2021 || 26 Oct 2021 || 69 || align=left | Disc.: Spacewatch || 
|- id="2003 GR31" bgcolor=#fefefe
| 3 ||  || MBA-I || 18.5 || data-sort-value="0.59" | 590 m || multiple || 2003–2018 || 14 Jun 2018 || 21 || align=left | Disc.: LPL/Spacewatch IIAdded on 19 October 2020 || 
|- id="2003 GS31" bgcolor=#E9E9E9
| 0 ||  || MBA-M || 16.83 || 2.4 km || multiple || 2003–2021 || 02 May 2021 || 111 || align=left | Disc.: LPL/Spacewatch IIAlt.: 2012 DF26, 2014 VE3 || 
|- id="2003 GH32" bgcolor=#fefefe
| 0 ||  || MBA-I || 17.61 || data-sort-value="0.89" | 890 m || multiple || 2003–2021 || 08 Sep 2021 || 266 || align=left | Disc.: LINEARAlt.: 2013 CH20 || 
|- id="2003 GS32" bgcolor=#d6d6d6
| 0 ||  || MBA-O || 16.7 || 2.5 km || multiple || 2003–2020 || 23 May 2020 || 53 || align=left | Disc.: Cerro Tololo || 
|- id="2003 GB33" bgcolor=#d6d6d6
| 0 ||  || MBA-O || 17.56 || 1.7 km || multiple || 2003–2021 || 07 Nov 2021 || 46 || align=left | Disc.: Cerro TololoAlt.: 2015 TC29 || 
|- id="2003 GD33" bgcolor=#d6d6d6
| 0 ||  || MBA-O || 17.15 || 2.1 km || multiple || 2003–2021 || 26 Sep 2021 || 58 || align=left | Disc.: Cerro TololoAdded on 17 June 2021Alt.: 2006 VX18 || 
|- id="2003 GE33" bgcolor=#E9E9E9
| 0 ||  || MBA-M || 17.49 || 1.8 km || multiple || 2003–2021 || 11 May 2021 || 94 || align=left | Disc.: Cerro TololoAlt.: 2007 EU27, 2009 SZ365 || 
|- id="2003 GS33" bgcolor=#E9E9E9
| 0 ||  || MBA-M || 17.7 || 1.2 km || multiple || 2003–2020 || 16 Mar 2020 || 64 || align=left | Disc.: Cerro Tololo || 
|- id="2003 GA34" bgcolor=#FA8072
| 1 ||  || MCA || 18.5 || data-sort-value="0.59" | 590 m || multiple || 2003–2014 || 12 Oct 2014 || 32 || align=left | Disc.: NEATAlt.: 2014 SN144 || 
|- id="2003 GB34" bgcolor=#FFC2E0
| 1 ||  || APO || 18.8 || data-sort-value="0.62" | 620 m || multiple || 2002–2006 || 19 Aug 2006 || 77 || align=left | Disc.: LINEAR || 
|- id="2003 GQ35" bgcolor=#E9E9E9
| 0 ||  || MBA-M || 17.66 || data-sort-value="0.87" | 870 m || multiple || 2001–2021 || 08 Sep 2021 || 68 || align=left | Disc.: LONEOSAdded on 22 July 2020 || 
|- id="2003 GG38" bgcolor=#fefefe
| 0 ||  || MBA-I || 17.5 || data-sort-value="0.94" | 940 m || multiple || 2003–2021 || 01 Feb 2021 || 110 || align=left | Disc.: LINEARAlt.: 2005 WQ189, 2010 HC52, 2012 WQ43 || 
|- id="2003 GU41" bgcolor=#FFC2E0
| 1 ||  || APO || 18.6 || data-sort-value="0.68" | 680 m || multiple || 2003–2006 || 07 Jan 2006 || 40 || align=left | Disc.: LONEOS || 
|- id="2003 GD42" bgcolor=#FFC2E0
| 6 ||  || APO || 24.7 || data-sort-value="0.041" | 41 m || single || 6 days || 15 Apr 2003 || 28 || align=left | Disc.: LINEAR || 
|- id="2003 GJ45" bgcolor=#fefefe
| 0 ||  || MBA-I || 17.9 || data-sort-value="0.78" | 780 m || multiple || 2003–2021 || 18 Jan 2021 || 70 || align=left | Disc.: NEAT || 
|- id="2003 GR45" bgcolor=#fefefe
| 0 ||  || MBA-I || 18.17 || data-sort-value="0.69" | 690 m || multiple || 2003–2021 || 03 May 2021 || 75 || align=left | Disc.: NEAT || 
|- id="2003 GN47" bgcolor=#E9E9E9
| 0 ||  || MBA-M || 17.61 || 1.3 km || multiple || 2003–2021 || 03 Oct 2021 || 126 || align=left | Disc.: Spacewatch || 
|- id="2003 GB48" bgcolor=#E9E9E9
| 0 ||  || MBA-M || 17.2 || 2.0 km || multiple || 2003–2020 || 22 Dec 2020 || 55 || align=left | Disc.: NEAT || 
|- id="2003 GU48" bgcolor=#E9E9E9
| 0 ||  || MBA-M || 16.90 || 1.8 km || multiple || 2003–2021 || 30 Nov 2021 || 145 || align=left | Disc.: NEATAdded on 22 July 2020Alt.: 2004 TL292, 2015 FR130, 2020 FR7 || 
|- id="2003 GV50" bgcolor=#fefefe
| 0 ||  || MBA-I || 17.43 || data-sort-value="0.97" | 970 m || multiple || 2003–2021 || 09 Sep 2021 || 217 || align=left | Disc.: AMOS || 
|- id="2003 GP51" bgcolor=#FFC2E0
| 7 ||  || APO || 22.0 || data-sort-value="0.14" | 140 m || single || 21 days || 05 May 2003 || 52 || align=left | Disc.: LONEOSPotentially hazardous object || 
|- id="2003 GB52" bgcolor=#fefefe
| 0 ||  || MBA-I || 18.23 || data-sort-value="0.67" | 670 m || multiple || 1994–2021 || 10 Jul 2021 || 86 || align=left | Disc.: Kitt Peak Obs. || 
|- id="2003 GR52" bgcolor=#fefefe
| 0 ||  || MBA-I || 18.6 || data-sort-value="0.57" | 570 m || multiple || 2003–2020 || 17 Sep 2020 || 73 || align=left | Disc.: Kitt Peak Obs. || 
|- id="2003 GM53" bgcolor=#C2E0FF
| E ||  || TNO || 6.9 || 143 km || single || 30 days || 01 May 2003 || 5 || align=left | Disc.: Kitt Peak Obs.LoUTNOs, cubewano? || 
|- id="2003 GP53" bgcolor=#E9E9E9
| 0 ||  || MBA-M || 17.80 || data-sort-value="0.82" | 820 m || multiple || 2003–2021 || 02 Dec 2021 || 124 || align=left | Disc.: Cerro TololoAlt.: 2008 SG28 || 
|- id="2003 GB54" bgcolor=#d6d6d6
| – ||  || MBA-O || 16.9 || 2.3 km || single || 5 days || 05 Apr 2003 || 13 || align=left | Disc.: Cerro Tololo || 
|- id="2003 GF55" bgcolor=#C2E0FF
| 4 ||  || TNO || 6.6 || 246 km || multiple || 2003–2013 || 13 Mar 2013 || 15 || align=left | Disc.: Kitt Peak Obs.LoUTNOs, cubewano (hot) || 
|- id="2003 GO56" bgcolor=#d6d6d6
| 0 ||  || MBA-O || 16.77 || 2.5 km || multiple || 2003–2021 || 29 Oct 2021 || 66 || align=left | Disc.: SpacewatchAlt.: 2015 OO62 || 
|- id="2003 GE57" bgcolor=#C2FFFF
| 0 ||  || JT || 14.14 || 8.3 km || multiple || 2002–2021 || 09 Nov 2021 || 154 || align=left | Disc.: SpacewatchGreek camp (L4)Alt.: 2013 BQ68 || 
|- id="2003 GM57" bgcolor=#d6d6d6
| 0 ||  || MBA-O || 17.30 || 1.9 km || multiple || 2003–2021 || 05 Jul 2021 || 41 || align=left | Disc.: LPL/Spacewatch IIAdded on 22 July 2020 || 
|- id="2003 GU57" bgcolor=#fefefe
| 0 ||  || MBA-I || 17.62 || data-sort-value="0.89" | 890 m || multiple || 2003–2022 || 08 Jan 2022 || 86 || align=left | Disc.: SDSS || 
|- id="2003 GW57" bgcolor=#d6d6d6
| 0 ||  || MBA-O || 16.2 || 3.2 km || multiple || 2003–2020 || 16 May 2020 || 128 || align=left | Disc.: SDSS || 
|- id="2003 GX57" bgcolor=#d6d6d6
| 0 ||  || HIL || 15.53 || 4.4 km || multiple || 2003–2021 || 25 Nov 2021 || 160 || align=left | Disc.: SDSS || 
|- id="2003 GZ57" bgcolor=#fefefe
| 0 ||  || MBA-I || 17.79 || data-sort-value="0.82" | 820 m || multiple || 2003–2021 || 12 May 2021 || 128 || align=left | Disc.: SDSS || 
|- id="2003 GC58" bgcolor=#fefefe
| 0 ||  || HUN || 18.6 || data-sort-value="0.57" | 570 m || multiple || 2003–2019 || 02 Jun 2019 || 81 || align=left | Disc.: Spacewatch || 
|- id="2003 GF58" bgcolor=#E9E9E9
| 0 ||  || MBA-M || 17.0 || 2.2 km || multiple || 2003–2019 || 24 Dec 2019 || 88 || align=left | Disc.: Spacewatch || 
|- id="2003 GG58" bgcolor=#fefefe
| 0 ||  || MBA-I || 17.9 || data-sort-value="0.78" | 780 m || multiple || 2000–2019 || 26 Oct 2019 || 93 || align=left | Disc.: Spacewatch || 
|- id="2003 GH58" bgcolor=#fefefe
| 0 ||  || MBA-I || 17.91 || data-sort-value="0.78" | 780 m || multiple || 2003–2021 || 11 May 2021 || 90 || align=left | Disc.: SDSS || 
|- id="2003 GJ58" bgcolor=#E9E9E9
| 0 ||  || MBA-M || 17.26 || 2.0 km || multiple || 2003–2021 || 10 May 2021 || 105 || align=left | Disc.: Spacewatch || 
|- id="2003 GL58" bgcolor=#fefefe
| 0 ||  || MBA-I || 18.3 || data-sort-value="0.65" | 650 m || multiple || 2003–2020 || 16 Jun 2020 || 75 || align=left | Disc.: Spacewatch || 
|- id="2003 GM58" bgcolor=#fefefe
| 1 ||  || MBA-I || 18.2 || data-sort-value="0.68" | 680 m || multiple || 1996–2018 || 08 Aug 2018 || 80 || align=left | Disc.: SpacewatchAlt.: 1996 FF14 || 
|- id="2003 GN58" bgcolor=#d6d6d6
| 0 ||  || MBA-O || 16.4 || 2.9 km || multiple || 2003–2020 || 21 May 2020 || 79 || align=left | Disc.: SDSS || 
|- id="2003 GP58" bgcolor=#C2FFFF
| 0 ||  || JT || 14.29 || 7.7 km || multiple || 2003–2021 || 09 Nov 2021 || 111 || align=left | Disc.: SpacewatchGreek camp (L4) || 
|- id="2003 GR58" bgcolor=#fefefe
| 0 ||  || MBA-I || 17.75 || data-sort-value="0.84" | 840 m || multiple || 2003–2021 || 08 May 2021 || 131 || align=left | Disc.: LPL/Spacewatch II || 
|- id="2003 GT58" bgcolor=#d6d6d6
| 0 ||  || MBA-O || 16.3 || 3.1 km || multiple || 2003–2020 || 24 Jun 2020 || 89 || align=left | Disc.: SDSS || 
|- id="2003 GV58" bgcolor=#E9E9E9
| 0 ||  || MBA-M || 16.9 || 2.3 km || multiple || 2003–2019 || 26 Nov 2019 || 76 || align=left | Disc.: SDSS || 
|- id="2003 GX58" bgcolor=#fefefe
| 0 ||  || MBA-I || 18.27 || data-sort-value="0.66" | 660 m || multiple || 2003–2021 || 30 Jun 2021 || 79 || align=left | Disc.: SDSS || 
|- id="2003 GZ58" bgcolor=#fefefe
| 0 ||  || MBA-I || 18.35 || data-sort-value="0.64" | 640 m || multiple || 2003–2021 || 08 Aug 2021 || 128 || align=left | Disc.: SpacewatchAlt.: 2010 NM86 || 
|- id="2003 GB59" bgcolor=#d6d6d6
| 0 ||  || MBA-O || 16.2 || 3.2 km || multiple || 2003–2020 || 25 May 2020 || 106 || align=left | Disc.: SDSS || 
|- id="2003 GC59" bgcolor=#d6d6d6
| 0 ||  || MBA-O || 16.6 || 2.7 km || multiple || 2003–2020 || 21 Apr 2020 || 62 || align=left | Disc.: SDSS || 
|- id="2003 GD59" bgcolor=#fefefe
| 0 ||  || MBA-I || 17.5 || data-sort-value="0.94" | 940 m || multiple || 2003–2021 || 07 Jan 2021 || 76 || align=left | Disc.: Spacewatch || 
|- id="2003 GG59" bgcolor=#E9E9E9
| 0 ||  || MBA-M || 17.29 || 1.9 km || multiple || 2003–2021 || 01 Apr 2021 || 120 || align=left | Disc.: Spacewatch || 
|- id="2003 GK59" bgcolor=#fefefe
| 0 ||  || MBA-I || 18.1 || data-sort-value="0.71" | 710 m || multiple || 2003–2019 || 25 Sep 2019 || 73 || align=left | Disc.: Spacewatch || 
|- id="2003 GL59" bgcolor=#E9E9E9
| 0 ||  || MBA-M || 17.3 || 1.9 km || multiple || 2003–2021 || 11 Jan 2021 || 78 || align=left | Disc.: Spacewatch || 
|- id="2003 GM59" bgcolor=#d6d6d6
| 0 ||  || MBA-O || 17.19 || 2.0 km || multiple || 2003–2021 || 04 Oct 2021 || 79 || align=left | Disc.: Kitt Peak Obs. || 
|- id="2003 GN59" bgcolor=#fefefe
| 0 ||  || MBA-I || 18.54 || data-sort-value="0.58" | 580 m || multiple || 2003–2021 || 29 Nov 2021 || 96 || align=left | Disc.: SDSSAlt.: 2010 PC46 || 
|- id="2003 GO59" bgcolor=#E9E9E9
| 0 ||  || MBA-M || 17.49 || 1.3 km || multiple || 2003–2021 || 24 Nov 2021 || 164 || align=left | Disc.: LPL/Spacewatch II || 
|- id="2003 GP59" bgcolor=#d6d6d6
| 0 ||  || MBA-O || 16.8 || 2.4 km || multiple || 2003–2020 || 23 May 2020 || 61 || align=left | Disc.: SDSS || 
|- id="2003 GV59" bgcolor=#d6d6d6
| 0 ||  || MBA-O || 16.93 || 2.3 km || multiple || 2003–2021 || 07 Aug 2021 || 96 || align=left | Disc.: Spacewatch || 
|- id="2003 GW59" bgcolor=#d6d6d6
| 0 ||  || MBA-O || 16.9 || 2.3 km || multiple || 2003–2019 || 27 Oct 2019 || 69 || align=left | Disc.: SDSS || 
|- id="2003 GX59" bgcolor=#E9E9E9
| 0 ||  || MBA-M || 16.88 || 2.3 km || multiple || 2003–2021 || 17 Apr 2021 || 133 || align=left | Disc.: SDSS || 
|- id="2003 GY59" bgcolor=#fefefe
| 0 ||  || MBA-I || 18.0 || data-sort-value="0.75" | 750 m || multiple || 2003–2019 || 19 Nov 2019 || 64 || align=left | Disc.: SDSS || 
|- id="2003 GZ59" bgcolor=#d6d6d6
| 0 ||  || MBA-O || 16.7 || 2.5 km || multiple || 2003–2020 || 13 May 2020 || 56 || align=left | Disc.: Kitt Peak Obs. || 
|- id="2003 GA60" bgcolor=#d6d6d6
| 0 ||  || MBA-O || 17.3 || 1.9 km || multiple || 2003–2020 || 11 Dec 2020 || 87 || align=left | Disc.: Kitt Peak Obs.Alt.: 2013 HC137 || 
|- id="2003 GB60" bgcolor=#E9E9E9
| 0 ||  || MBA-M || 17.29 || 1.0 km || multiple || 2003–2021 || 30 Nov 2021 || 129 || align=left | Disc.: SDSS || 
|- id="2003 GC60" bgcolor=#E9E9E9
| 0 ||  || MBA-M || 17.86 || 1.1 km || multiple || 2003–2021 || 13 Jul 2021 || 85 || align=left | Disc.: SDSS || 
|- id="2003 GF60" bgcolor=#fefefe
| 0 ||  || MBA-I || 17.99 || data-sort-value="0.75" | 750 m || multiple || 2003–2021 || 03 May 2021 || 70 || align=left | Disc.: SDSS || 
|- id="2003 GG60" bgcolor=#E9E9E9
| 0 ||  || MBA-M || 17.5 || 1.8 km || multiple || 2003–2018 || 07 Sep 2018 || 45 || align=left | Disc.: SDSS || 
|- id="2003 GH60" bgcolor=#d6d6d6
| 0 ||  || MBA-O || 16.5 || 2.8 km || multiple || 2003–2021 || 10 Jun 2021 || 60 || align=left | Disc.: SDSS || 
|- id="2003 GJ60" bgcolor=#d6d6d6
| 0 ||  || MBA-O || 17.17 || 2.0 km || multiple || 2003–2021 || 12 Jun 2021 || 78 || align=left | Disc.: SDSS || 
|- id="2003 GK60" bgcolor=#d6d6d6
| 1 ||  || MBA-O || 16.9 || 2.3 km || multiple || 2003–2020 || 21 Apr 2020 || 51 || align=left | Disc.: Kitt Peak Obs. || 
|- id="2003 GL60" bgcolor=#fefefe
| 0 ||  || MBA-I || 18.1 || data-sort-value="0.71" | 710 m || multiple || 2003–2021 || 18 Jan 2021 || 56 || align=left | Disc.: Spacewatch || 
|- id="2003 GM60" bgcolor=#fefefe
| 0 ||  || MBA-I || 18.1 || data-sort-value="0.71" | 710 m || multiple || 2003–2020 || 26 Jan 2020 || 44 || align=left | Disc.: SDSS || 
|- id="2003 GO60" bgcolor=#fefefe
| 0 ||  || MBA-I || 17.8 || data-sort-value="0.82" | 820 m || multiple || 2003–2019 || 25 Sep 2019 || 74 || align=left | Disc.: Spacewatch || 
|- id="2003 GP60" bgcolor=#d6d6d6
| 0 ||  || MBA-O || 16.7 || 2.5 km || multiple || 2003–2020 || 26 May 2020 || 97 || align=left | Disc.: SDSS || 
|- id="2003 GQ60" bgcolor=#fefefe
| 0 ||  || MBA-I || 18.35 || data-sort-value="0.64" | 640 m || multiple || 2003–2021 || 17 Apr 2021 || 57 || align=left | Disc.: Kitt Peak Obs. || 
|- id="2003 GR60" bgcolor=#fefefe
| 0 ||  || MBA-I || 18.37 || data-sort-value="0.63" | 630 m || multiple || 2003–2021 || 30 Nov 2021 || 55 || align=left | Disc.: Spacewatch || 
|- id="2003 GS60" bgcolor=#fefefe
| 0 ||  || MBA-I || 18.82 || data-sort-value="0.51" | 510 m || multiple || 1996–2021 || 03 Aug 2021 || 47 || align=left | Disc.: Spacewatch || 
|- id="2003 GT60" bgcolor=#fefefe
| 1 ||  || HUN || 18.7 || data-sort-value="0.54" | 540 m || multiple || 2003–2017 || 17 Oct 2017 || 40 || align=left | Disc.: Spacewatch || 
|- id="2003 GU60" bgcolor=#fefefe
| 0 ||  || HUN || 19.19 || data-sort-value="0.43" | 430 m || multiple || 2003–2021 || 04 Oct 2021 || 63 || align=left | Disc.: Spacewatch || 
|- id="2003 GV60" bgcolor=#fefefe
| 0 ||  || MBA-I || 18.3 || data-sort-value="0.65" | 650 m || multiple || 2003–2021 || 05 Jun 2021 || 77 || align=left | Disc.: Spacewatch || 
|- id="2003 GW60" bgcolor=#fefefe
| 1 ||  || MBA-I || 18.2 || data-sort-value="0.68" | 680 m || multiple || 2003–2018 || 07 Sep 2018 || 39 || align=left | Disc.: Spacewatch || 
|- id="2003 GZ60" bgcolor=#fefefe
| 0 ||  || MBA-I || 18.1 || data-sort-value="0.71" | 710 m || multiple || 2003–2021 || 15 Jan 2021 || 45 || align=left | Disc.: Spacewatch || 
|- id="2003 GA61" bgcolor=#fefefe
| 0 ||  || MBA-I || 18.46 || data-sort-value="0.60" | 600 m || multiple || 2003–2021 || 08 May 2021 || 81 || align=left | Disc.: NEATAlt.: 2010 JP140 || 
|- id="2003 GB61" bgcolor=#d6d6d6
| 0 ||  || MBA-O || 16.35 || 3.0 km || multiple || 2003–2021 || 11 Jul 2021 || 83 || align=left | Disc.: SpacewatchAlt.: 2010 JR24 || 
|- id="2003 GE61" bgcolor=#E9E9E9
| 0 ||  || MBA-M || 17.9 || 1.5 km || multiple || 2003–2021 || 16 Jan 2021 || 38 || align=left | Disc.: Spacewatch || 
|- id="2003 GF61" bgcolor=#E9E9E9
| 0 ||  || MBA-M || 17.5 || 1.8 km || multiple || 2003–2019 || 23 Oct 2019 || 40 || align=left | Disc.: LPL/Spacewatch II || 
|- id="2003 GH61" bgcolor=#fefefe
| 1 ||  || MBA-I || 18.5 || data-sort-value="0.59" | 590 m || multiple || 1994–2020 || 23 Nov 2020 || 39 || align=left | Disc.: Kitt Peak Obs. || 
|- id="2003 GJ61" bgcolor=#d6d6d6
| 0 ||  || MBA-O || 15.9 || 3.7 km || multiple || 2003–2021 || 17 Jan 2021 || 69 || align=left | Disc.: SDSSAlt.: 2010 DZ103 || 
|- id="2003 GK61" bgcolor=#d6d6d6
| 0 ||  || MBA-O || 16.1 || 3.4 km || multiple || 2000–2020 || 22 Mar 2020 || 52 || align=left | Disc.: Spacewatch || 
|- id="2003 GL61" bgcolor=#d6d6d6
| 0 ||  || MBA-O || 16.6 || 2.7 km || multiple || 2003–2020 || 21 Jul 2020 || 54 || align=left | Disc.: SDSS || 
|- id="2003 GM61" bgcolor=#fefefe
| 0 ||  || MBA-I || 18.3 || data-sort-value="0.65" | 650 m || multiple || 2003–2014 || 06 May 2014 || 26 || align=left | Disc.: Spacewatch || 
|- id="2003 GN61" bgcolor=#E9E9E9
| 0 ||  || MBA-M || 18.3 || data-sort-value="0.92" | 920 m || multiple || 2003–2020 || 25 Feb 2020 || 50 || align=left | Disc.: SDSS || 
|- id="2003 GO61" bgcolor=#E9E9E9
| 1 ||  || MBA-M || 18.32 || 1.2 km || multiple || 2003–2021 || 29 Apr 2021 || 47 || align=left | Disc.: Spacewatch || 
|- id="2003 GP61" bgcolor=#fefefe
| 1 ||  || MBA-I || 19.01 || data-sort-value="0.47" | 470 m || multiple || 2003–2021 || 13 Apr 2021 || 24 || align=left | Disc.: NEAT || 
|- id="2003 GQ61" bgcolor=#fefefe
| 0 ||  || MBA-I || 17.7 || data-sort-value="0.86" | 860 m || multiple || 2003–2019 || 26 Nov 2019 || 88 || align=left | Disc.: Spacewatch || 
|- id="2003 GR61" bgcolor=#fefefe
| 0 ||  || MBA-I || 17.4 || data-sort-value="0.98" | 980 m || multiple || 2003–2020 || 11 Dec 2020 || 103 || align=left | Disc.: Spacewatch || 
|- id="2003 GV61" bgcolor=#fefefe
| 0 ||  || MBA-I || 18.4 || data-sort-value="0.62" | 620 m || multiple || 2003–2020 || 23 Nov 2020 || 89 || align=left | Disc.: LPL/Spacewatch II || 
|- id="2003 GW61" bgcolor=#fefefe
| 0 ||  || MBA-I || 17.94 || data-sort-value="0.77" | 770 m || multiple || 2000–2021 || 10 May 2021 || 100 || align=left | Disc.: SDSS || 
|- id="2003 GY61" bgcolor=#fefefe
| 0 ||  || MBA-I || 17.9 || data-sort-value="0.78" | 780 m || multiple || 2003–2021 || 04 Jan 2021 || 71 || align=left | Disc.: Spacewatch || 
|- id="2003 GC62" bgcolor=#d6d6d6
| 0 ||  || MBA-O || 16.20 || 3.2 km || multiple || 2003–2022 || 26 Jan 2022 || 78 || align=left | Disc.: Kitt Peak Obs. || 
|- id="2003 GE62" bgcolor=#E9E9E9
| 0 ||  || MBA-M || 17.1 || 2.1 km || multiple || 2003–2021 || 18 Jan 2021 || 69 || align=left | Disc.: SDSS || 
|- id="2003 GF62" bgcolor=#fefefe
| 0 ||  || MBA-I || 18.3 || data-sort-value="0.65" | 650 m || multiple || 2003–2020 || 27 Feb 2020 || 68 || align=left | Disc.: Cerro Tololo || 
|- id="2003 GJ62" bgcolor=#fefefe
| 0 ||  || MBA-I || 18.17 || data-sort-value="0.69" | 690 m || multiple || 2003–2021 || 04 Aug 2021 || 84 || align=left | Disc.: SDSS || 
|- id="2003 GK62" bgcolor=#E9E9E9
| 0 ||  || MBA-M || 17.75 || data-sort-value="0.84" | 840 m || multiple || 2003–2021 || 09 Sep 2021 || 67 || align=left | Disc.: Spacewatch || 
|- id="2003 GM62" bgcolor=#E9E9E9
| 0 ||  || MBA-M || 17.4 || 1.4 km || multiple || 2003–2020 || 21 May 2020 || 55 || align=left | Disc.: SDSS || 
|- id="2003 GN62" bgcolor=#d6d6d6
| 0 ||  || MBA-O || 16.6 || 2.7 km || multiple || 2003–2019 || 03 Jun 2019 || 46 || align=left | Disc.: SDSS || 
|- id="2003 GO62" bgcolor=#fefefe
| 0 ||  || MBA-I || 18.1 || data-sort-value="0.71" | 710 m || multiple || 2003–2019 || 26 Sep 2019 || 41 || align=left | Disc.: Spacewatch || 
|- id="2003 GP62" bgcolor=#E9E9E9
| 0 ||  || MBA-M || 17.0 || 2.2 km || multiple || 2003–2019 || 05 Nov 2019 || 58 || align=left | Disc.: SDSS || 
|- id="2003 GQ62" bgcolor=#fefefe
| 0 ||  || MBA-I || 18.07 || data-sort-value="0.72" | 720 m || multiple || 1995–2022 || 08 Jan 2022 || 61 || align=left | Disc.: SpacewatchAlt.: 1995 CN5 || 
|- id="2003 GR62" bgcolor=#E9E9E9
| 0 ||  || MBA-M || 17.05 || 1.2 km || multiple || 2003–2021 || 30 Nov 2021 || 107 || align=left | Disc.: SDSS || 
|- id="2003 GS62" bgcolor=#E9E9E9
| 0 ||  || MBA-M || 17.32 || 1.9 km || multiple || 2003–2021 || 13 May 2021 || 102 || align=left | Disc.: NEAT || 
|- id="2003 GT62" bgcolor=#E9E9E9
| 0 ||  || MBA-M || 16.9 || 2.3 km || multiple || 2003–2021 || 24 Jan 2021 || 56 || align=left | Disc.: Spacewatch || 
|- id="2003 GU62" bgcolor=#E9E9E9
| 0 ||  || MBA-M || 17.30 || 1.0 km || multiple || 2003–2021 || 30 Nov 2021 || 157 || align=left | Disc.: SDSS || 
|- id="2003 GV62" bgcolor=#fefefe
| 0 ||  || MBA-I || 18.19 || data-sort-value="0.68" | 680 m || multiple || 2003–2021 || 08 Apr 2021 || 64 || align=left | Disc.: Spacewatch || 
|- id="2003 GW62" bgcolor=#fefefe
| 0 ||  || MBA-I || 17.9 || data-sort-value="0.78" | 780 m || multiple || 2003–2020 || 14 Dec 2020 || 54 || align=left | Disc.: Kitt Peak Obs. || 
|- id="2003 GX62" bgcolor=#fefefe
| 0 ||  || MBA-I || 17.6 || data-sort-value="0.90" | 900 m || multiple || 2003–2020 || 14 Nov 2020 || 86 || align=left | Disc.: SDSS || 
|- id="2003 GY62" bgcolor=#fefefe
| 0 ||  || MBA-I || 18.0 || data-sort-value="0.75" | 750 m || multiple || 2003–2020 || 10 Dec 2020 || 48 || align=left | Disc.: Spacewatch || 
|- id="2003 GZ62" bgcolor=#d6d6d6
| 0 ||  || MBA-O || 16.98 || 2.2 km || multiple || 2003–2021 || 27 Oct 2021 || 47 || align=left | Disc.: SDSS || 
|- id="2003 GB63" bgcolor=#fefefe
| 0 ||  || MBA-I || 17.7 || data-sort-value="0.86" | 860 m || multiple || 2003–2019 || 22 Oct 2019 || 41 || align=left | Disc.: NEAT || 
|- id="2003 GC63" bgcolor=#fefefe
| 0 ||  || MBA-I || 18.41 || data-sort-value="0.62" | 620 m || multiple || 2006–2021 || 30 Jun 2021 || 60 || align=left | Disc.: Spacewatch || 
|- id="2003 GE63" bgcolor=#E9E9E9
| 0 ||  || MBA-M || 17.2 || 1.5 km || multiple || 2003–2020 || 26 May 2020 || 81 || align=left | Disc.: SDSS || 
|- id="2003 GF63" bgcolor=#fefefe
| 0 ||  || MBA-I || 18.6 || data-sort-value="0.57" | 570 m || multiple || 2003–2019 || 11 May 2019 || 41 || align=left | Disc.: SDSS || 
|- id="2003 GG63" bgcolor=#d6d6d6
| 0 ||  || MBA-O || 16.64 || 2.6 km || multiple || 2003–2021 || 30 Jun 2021 || 52 || align=left | Disc.: SDSS || 
|- id="2003 GH63" bgcolor=#E9E9E9
| 0 ||  || MBA-M || 17.89 || 1.1 km || multiple || 2003–2021 || 09 Jul 2021 || 46 || align=left | Disc.: Spacewatch || 
|- id="2003 GK63" bgcolor=#d6d6d6
| 0 ||  || MBA-O || 16.1 || 3.4 km || multiple || 2003–2020 || 22 Apr 2020 || 100 || align=left | Disc.: SpacewatchAlt.: 2010 HV16 || 
|- id="2003 GM63" bgcolor=#d6d6d6
| 0 ||  || MBA-O || 16.6 || 2.7 km || multiple || 2003–2020 || 24 Jun 2020 || 63 || align=left | Disc.: Spacewatch || 
|- id="2003 GN63" bgcolor=#E9E9E9
| 0 ||  || MBA-M || 18.07 || 1.0 km || multiple || 2003–2021 || 08 Sep 2021 || 46 || align=left | Disc.: Spacewatch || 
|- id="2003 GO63" bgcolor=#fefefe
| 0 ||  || MBA-I || 18.4 || data-sort-value="0.62" | 620 m || multiple || 2003–2019 || 09 Aug 2019 || 44 || align=left | Disc.: SDSS || 
|- id="2003 GP63" bgcolor=#fefefe
| 0 ||  || MBA-I || 18.5 || data-sort-value="0.59" | 590 m || multiple || 2003–2019 || 20 Dec 2019 || 62 || align=left | Disc.: Kitt Peak Obs. || 
|- id="2003 GQ63" bgcolor=#d6d6d6
| 0 ||  || MBA-O || 17.1 || 2.1 km || multiple || 2003–2019 || 04 Apr 2019 || 38 || align=left | Disc.: Kitt Peak Obs. || 
|- id="2003 GR63" bgcolor=#fefefe
| 3 ||  || MBA-I || 18.6 || data-sort-value="0.57" | 570 m || multiple || 2003–2018 || 08 Aug 2018 || 37 || align=left | Disc.: SDSS || 
|- id="2003 GS63" bgcolor=#fefefe
| 0 ||  || MBA-I || 18.7 || data-sort-value="0.54" | 540 m || multiple || 2003–2020 || 14 Dec 2020 || 39 || align=left | Disc.: SDSS || 
|- id="2003 GT63" bgcolor=#d6d6d6
| 0 ||  || MBA-O || 17.09 || 2.1 km || multiple || 2003–2021 || 08 Sep 2021 || 46 || align=left | Disc.: Spacewatch || 
|- id="2003 GU63" bgcolor=#fefefe
| 0 ||  || MBA-I || 18.1 || data-sort-value="0.71" | 710 m || multiple || 2003–2019 || 24 Aug 2019 || 32 || align=left | Disc.: Kitt Peak Obs. || 
|- id="2003 GV63" bgcolor=#E9E9E9
| 0 ||  || MBA-M || 17.8 || 1.2 km || multiple || 2003–2020 || 25 Apr 2020 || 68 || align=left | Disc.: Spacewatch || 
|- id="2003 GW63" bgcolor=#E9E9E9
| 0 ||  || MBA-M || 16.9 || 1.8 km || multiple || 2003–2020 || 18 May 2020 || 49 || align=left | Disc.: SDSS || 
|- id="2003 GX63" bgcolor=#d6d6d6
| 0 ||  || MBA-O || 16.6 || 2.7 km || multiple || 2003–2020 || 12 May 2020 || 41 || align=left | Disc.: SDSS || 
|- id="2003 GY63" bgcolor=#d6d6d6
| 0 ||  || MBA-O || 17.4 || 1.8 km || multiple || 2003–2020 || 27 Apr 2020 || 41 || align=left | Disc.: LPL/Spacewatch II || 
|- id="2003 GZ63" bgcolor=#fefefe
| 1 ||  || MBA-I || 18.5 || data-sort-value="0.59" | 590 m || multiple || 2003–2018 || 18 Mar 2018 || 30 || align=left | Disc.: Spacewatch || 
|- id="2003 GA64" bgcolor=#d6d6d6
| 0 ||  || MBA-O || 17.14 || 2.1 km || multiple || 2003–2021 || 29 Nov 2021 || 58 || align=left | Disc.: SDSS || 
|- id="2003 GB64" bgcolor=#fefefe
| 0 ||  || MBA-I || 18.6 || data-sort-value="0.57" | 570 m || multiple || 2003–2020 || 18 Jul 2020 || 92 || align=left | Disc.: Spacewatch || 
|- id="2003 GC64" bgcolor=#fefefe
| 3 ||  || MBA-I || 18.1 || data-sort-value="0.71" | 710 m || multiple || 2003–2020 || 20 Oct 2020 || 23 || align=left | Disc.: NEAT || 
|- id="2003 GD64" bgcolor=#fefefe
| 0 ||  || MBA-I || 17.4 || data-sort-value="0.98" | 980 m || multiple || 2003–2019 || 03 Oct 2019 || 100 || align=left | Disc.: Spacewatch || 
|- id="2003 GE64" bgcolor=#fefefe
| 0 ||  || MBA-I || 17.8 || data-sort-value="0.82" | 820 m || multiple || 2003–2019 || 25 Sep 2019 || 83 || align=left | Disc.: Spacewatch || 
|- id="2003 GF64" bgcolor=#d6d6d6
| 0 ||  || MBA-O || 16.3 || 3.1 km || multiple || 1994–2020 || 25 May 2020 || 102 || align=left | Disc.: Kitt Peak Obs. || 
|- id="2003 GG64" bgcolor=#C2FFFF
| 0 ||  || JT || 13.91 || 9.2 km || multiple || 2003–2021 || 28 Nov 2021 || 176 || align=left | Disc.: SDSSGreek camp (L4) || 
|- id="2003 GH64" bgcolor=#E9E9E9
| 0 ||  || MBA-M || 17.1 || 2.1 km || multiple || 2003–2021 || 16 Jan 2021 || 85 || align=left | Disc.: SDSS || 
|- id="2003 GJ64" bgcolor=#C2FFFF
| 0 ||  || JT || 14.04 || 8.7 km || multiple || 2003–2021 || 03 Dec 2021 || 158 || align=left | Disc.: SpacewatchGreek camp (L4) || 
|- id="2003 GL64" bgcolor=#d6d6d6
| 0 ||  || MBA-O || 16.7 || 2.5 km || multiple || 2003–2019 || 05 Feb 2019 || 60 || align=left | Disc.: SDSS || 
|- id="2003 GM64" bgcolor=#C2FFFF
| 0 ||  || JT || 14.29 || 7.7 km || multiple || 2003–2021 || 05 Dec 2021 || 119 || align=left | Disc.: SDSSGreek camp (L4) || 
|- id="2003 GN64" bgcolor=#fefefe
| 0 ||  || MBA-I || 18.2 || data-sort-value="0.68" | 680 m || multiple || 2003–2019 || 05 Feb 2019 || 52 || align=left | Disc.: SDSS || 
|- id="2003 GS64" bgcolor=#fefefe
| 0 ||  || MBA-I || 18.0 || data-sort-value="0.75" | 750 m || multiple || 2003–2019 || 24 Aug 2019 || 46 || align=left | Disc.: Spacewatch || 
|- id="2003 GU64" bgcolor=#d6d6d6
| 0 ||  || MBA-O || 16.7 || 2.5 km || multiple || 2003–2021 || 06 Oct 2021 || 63 || align=left | Disc.: Spacewatch || 
|- id="2003 GV64" bgcolor=#d6d6d6
| 0 ||  || MBA-O || 16.62 || 2.6 km || multiple || 2003–2021 || 08 Aug 2021 || 71 || align=left | Disc.: Kitt Peak Obs. || 
|- id="2003 GX64" bgcolor=#fefefe
| 0 ||  || MBA-I || 18.5 || data-sort-value="0.59" | 590 m || multiple || 2003–2019 || 23 Oct 2019 || 44 || align=left | Disc.: LPL/Spacewatch II || 
|- id="2003 GY64" bgcolor=#E9E9E9
| 0 ||  || MBA-M || 18.52 || data-sort-value="0.59" | 590 m || multiple || 2003–2021 || 08 Sep 2021 || 44 || align=left | Disc.: Kitt Peak Obs. || 
|- id="2003 GA65" bgcolor=#fefefe
| 0 ||  || MBA-I || 18.80 || data-sort-value="0.52" | 520 m || multiple || 2003–2021 || 03 May 2021 || 43 || align=left | Disc.: Spacewatch || 
|- id="2003 GB65" bgcolor=#fefefe
| 0 ||  || MBA-I || 18.0 || data-sort-value="0.75" | 750 m || multiple || 2003–2021 || 11 Jun 2021 || 85 || align=left | Disc.: NEAT || 
|- id="2003 GC65" bgcolor=#d6d6d6
| 0 ||  || MBA-O || 17.41 || 1.8 km || multiple || 2003–2021 || 30 Sep 2021 || 43 || align=left | Disc.: SDSS || 
|- id="2003 GD65" bgcolor=#E9E9E9
| 0 ||  || MBA-M || 16.8 || 2.4 km || multiple || 1994–2020 || 22 Dec 2020 || 73 || align=left | Disc.: SDSS || 
|- id="2003 GE65" bgcolor=#fefefe
| 0 ||  || MBA-I || 19.0 || data-sort-value="0.47" | 470 m || multiple || 2003–2019 || 02 Nov 2019 || 74 || align=left | Disc.: Kitt Peak Obs. || 
|- id="2003 GF65" bgcolor=#fefefe
| 0 ||  || MBA-I || 18.58 || data-sort-value="0.57" | 570 m || multiple || 2003–2021 || 09 Apr 2021 || 93 || align=left | Disc.: Spacewatch || 
|- id="2003 GH65" bgcolor=#fefefe
| 0 ||  || MBA-I || 18.4 || data-sort-value="0.62" | 620 m || multiple || 2003–2019 || 03 Dec 2019 || 49 || align=left | Disc.: Kitt Peak Obs. || 
|- id="2003 GJ65" bgcolor=#fefefe
| 0 ||  || MBA-I || 17.9 || data-sort-value="0.78" | 780 m || multiple || 2003–2020 || 20 Dec 2020 || 74 || align=left | Disc.: SDSS || 
|- id="2003 GK65" bgcolor=#E9E9E9
| 0 ||  || MBA-M || 17.99 || data-sort-value="0.75" | 750 m || multiple || 2003–2021 || 30 Oct 2021 || 41 || align=left | Disc.: SDSS || 
|- id="2003 GL65" bgcolor=#d6d6d6
| 0 ||  || MBA-O || 17.3 || 1.9 km || multiple || 2003–2020 || 14 Dec 2020 || 38 || align=left | Disc.: Spacewatch || 
|- id="2003 GM65" bgcolor=#fefefe
| 0 ||  || MBA-I || 18.7 || data-sort-value="0.54" | 540 m || multiple || 2003–2020 || 21 Feb 2020 || 47 || align=left | Disc.: SDSS || 
|- id="2003 GN65" bgcolor=#E9E9E9
| 0 ||  || MBA-M || 17.9 || 1.5 km || multiple || 2003–2019 || 05 Nov 2019 || 33 || align=left | Disc.: Kitt Peak Obs. || 
|- id="2003 GO65" bgcolor=#E9E9E9
| 0 ||  || MBA-M || 16.7 || 2.5 km || multiple || 1996–2021 || 18 Jan 2021 || 114 || align=left | Disc.: SDSS || 
|- id="2003 GP65" bgcolor=#E9E9E9
| 0 ||  || MBA-M || 17.53 || data-sort-value="0.93" | 930 m || multiple || 2003–2021 || 09 Aug 2021 || 116 || align=left | Disc.: SDSS || 
|- id="2003 GR65" bgcolor=#E9E9E9
| 0 ||  || MBA-M || 17.5 || 1.8 km || multiple || 2003–2021 || 15 Jan 2021 || 57 || align=left | Disc.: Kitt Peak Obs. || 
|- id="2003 GS65" bgcolor=#d6d6d6
| 0 ||  || MBA-O || 17.02 || 2.2 km || multiple || 2003–2021 || 30 May 2021 || 68 || align=left | Disc.: SDSS || 
|- id="2003 GU65" bgcolor=#fefefe
| 0 ||  || MBA-I || 17.9 || data-sort-value="0.78" | 780 m || multiple || 2003–2020 || 14 Dec 2020 || 77 || align=left | Disc.: Kitt Peak Obs. || 
|- id="2003 GV65" bgcolor=#E9E9E9
| 0 ||  || MBA-M || 18.1 || 1.0 km || multiple || 2003–2020 || 22 Mar 2020 || 32 || align=left | Disc.: Kitt Peak Obs. || 
|- id="2003 GW65" bgcolor=#E9E9E9
| 1 ||  || MBA-M || 18.28 || data-sort-value="0.66" | 660 m || multiple || 2003–2021 || 11 Nov 2021 || 42 || align=left | Disc.: Spacewatch || 
|- id="2003 GX65" bgcolor=#fefefe
| 0 ||  || MBA-I || 18.3 || data-sort-value="0.65" | 650 m || multiple || 2003–2019 || 26 Oct 2019 || 25 || align=left | Disc.: SDSS || 
|- id="2003 GA66" bgcolor=#fefefe
| 0 ||  || MBA-I || 18.0 || data-sort-value="0.75" | 750 m || multiple || 2003–2019 || 28 Oct 2019 || 57 || align=left | Disc.: SpacewatchAdded on 22 July 2020 || 
|- id="2003 GB66" bgcolor=#E9E9E9
| 0 ||  || MBA-M || 17.80 || 1.2 km || multiple || 2003–2021 || 05 Oct 2021 || 73 || align=left | Disc.: NEATAdded on 22 July 2020 || 
|- id="2003 GC66" bgcolor=#E9E9E9
| 0 ||  || MBA-M || 17.91 || 1.1 km || multiple || 2003–2021 || 26 Oct 2021 || 76 || align=left | Disc.: SpacewatchAdded on 22 July 2020 || 
|- id="2003 GD66" bgcolor=#d6d6d6
| 0 ||  || MBA-O || 16.94 || 2.3 km || multiple || 2003–2021 || 02 Aug 2021 || 54 || align=left | Disc.: SpacewatchAdded on 22 July 2020 || 
|- id="2003 GE66" bgcolor=#d6d6d6
| 0 ||  || MBA-O || 17.16 || 2.1 km || multiple || 2003–2021 || 08 Sep 2021 || 84 || align=left | Disc.: SpacewatchAdded on 22 July 2020 || 
|- id="2003 GG66" bgcolor=#fefefe
| 0 ||  || MBA-I || 18.85 || data-sort-value="0.50" | 500 m || multiple || 2003–2021 || 18 Apr 2021 || 61 || align=left | Disc.: SpacewatchAdded on 22 July 2020 || 
|- id="2003 GH66" bgcolor=#d6d6d6
| 0 ||  || MBA-O || 16.4 || 2.9 km || multiple || 2003–2020 || 26 Apr 2020 || 56 || align=left | Disc.: SpacewatchAdded on 22 July 2020 || 
|- id="2003 GJ66" bgcolor=#fefefe
| 0 ||  || MBA-I || 18.54 || data-sort-value="0.58" | 580 m || multiple || 2003–2021 || 06 Nov 2021 || 96 || align=left | Disc.: Kitt Peak Obs.Added on 22 July 2020 || 
|- id="2003 GL66" bgcolor=#E9E9E9
| 0 ||  || MBA-M || 17.08 || 1.1 km || multiple || 2003–2021 || 30 Nov 2021 || 131 || align=left | Disc.: LPL/Spacewatch IIAdded on 13 September 2020 || 
|- id="2003 GM66" bgcolor=#E9E9E9
| 0 ||  || MBA-M || 17.74 || 1.2 km || multiple || 2003–2021 || 05 Oct 2021 || 64 || align=left | Disc.: SDSSAdded on 13 September 2020 || 
|- id="2003 GO66" bgcolor=#d6d6d6
| 0 ||  || MBA-O || 17.4 || 1.8 km || multiple || 2003–2020 || 16 Jun 2020 || 26 || align=left | Disc.: SDSSAdded on 19 October 2020 || 
|- id="2003 GQ66" bgcolor=#fefefe
| 0 ||  || MBA-I || 18.2 || data-sort-value="0.68" | 680 m || multiple || 2003–2020 || 14 Nov 2020 || 77 || align=left | Disc.: SpacewatchAdded on 17 January 2021 || 
|- id="2003 GR66" bgcolor=#d6d6d6
| 1 ||  || MBA-O || 16.9 || 2.3 km || multiple || 2003–2020 || 21 Apr 2020 || 40 || align=left | Disc.: NEATAdded on 17 January 2021 || 
|- id="2003 GT66" bgcolor=#E9E9E9
| 1 ||  || MBA-M || 18.23 || 1.3 km || multiple || 2003–2021 || 31 Mar 2021 || 36 || align=left | Disc.: SDSSAdded on 9 March 2021 || 
|- id="2003 GV66" bgcolor=#fefefe
| 1 ||  || MBA-I || 18.3 || data-sort-value="0.65" | 650 m || multiple || 2003–2021 || 22 May 2021 || 33 || align=left | Disc.: SpacewatchAdded on 17 June 2021 || 
|- id="2003 GX66" bgcolor=#E9E9E9
| 0 ||  || MBA-M || 17.2 || 2.0 km || multiple || 2003–2021 || 18 Mar 2021 || 48 || align=left | Disc.: SpacewatchAdded on 21 August 2021 || 
|- id="2003 GY66" bgcolor=#d6d6d6
| 0 ||  || MBA-O || 16.74 || 2.5 km || multiple || 2003–2021 || 12 Sep 2021 || 47 || align=left | Disc.: SDSSAdded on 30 September 2021 || 
|- id="2003 GC67" bgcolor=#d6d6d6
| 0 ||  || MBA-O || 16.9 || 2.3 km || multiple || 2003–2021 || 31 Aug 2021 || 52 || align=left | Disc.: SDSSAdded on 30 September 2021 || 
|- id="2003 GD67" bgcolor=#d6d6d6
| 0 ||  || MBA-O || 16.3 || 3.1 km || multiple || 2003–2021 || 06 Nov 2021 || 44 || align=left | Disc.: LPL/Spacewatch IIAdded on 24 December 2021 || 
|- id="2003 GE67" bgcolor=#d6d6d6
| 0 ||  || MBA-O || 16.91 || 2.3 km || multiple || 2003–2021 || 28 Nov 2021 || 38 || align=left | Disc.: SDSSAdded on 24 December 2021 || 
|- id="2003 GF67" bgcolor=#fefefe
| 0 ||  || MBA-I || 18.2 || data-sort-value="0.68" | 680 m || multiple || 2003–2019 || 06 Oct 2019 || 26 || align=left | Disc.: SDSSAdded on 29 January 2022 || 
|}
back to top

References 
 

Lists of unnumbered minor planets